= List of fungi of South Africa – A =

This is an alphabetical list of fungal taxa as recorded from South Africa. Currently accepted names have been appended.

== Ab ==
Genus Abrothallus Pérez-Ort. & Suija (2013), Abrothallaceae (Lichenicolous fungi)

- Abrothallus parmeliarum Nyl. [sic] probably (Sommerf.) Arnold 1874

== Ac ==
Genus Acarospora A.Massal. (1852) Acarosporaceae (Lichenised fiungi)

- Acarospora angolensis H. Magn. 1929
- Acarospora austroafricana (Zahlbr.) H. Magn. 1933
- Acarospora bella Jatta 1906
- Acarospora bylii H. Magn. 1933
- Acarospora calviniensis H. Magn. 1933
- Acarospora capensis Zahlbr. 1926
- Acarospora cervina A. Massal. (1852),
- Acarospora citrina (Taylor) Zahlbr. (1913).
- Acarospora crassilabra (Müll. Arg.) Zahlbr. 1927
- Acarospora deserticola Zahlbr. 1926
- Acarospora finckei Zahlbr. 1927
  - Acarospora finckei var. lobulata H. Magn. ex Zahlbr. 1932
- Acarospora fuscata (Ach.) Arnold (1871)
- Acarospora immixta H. Magn. 1929
- Acarospora initialis H. Magn. 1929
  - Acarospora initialis var. perfectior H. Magn. 1933
- Acarospora insculpta H. Magn. 1933
- Acarospora intermixta H. Magn. 1933
- Acarospora intrusa H. Magn. 1933
- Acarospora laeta H. Magn. 1933
  - Acarospora laeta var. annularis H. Magn. 1933
- Acarospora laevigata H. Magn. 1933
- Acarospora longispora H. Magn. 1933
- Acarospora lucida H. Magn. 1929
- Acarospora luderitzensis H. Magn. 1933
- Acarospora macrospora (Hepp ex Nyl.) A. Massal. ex Bagl. (1857)
- Acarospora meridionalis H. Magn. 1932
- Acarospora negligens H. Magn. (1929)
- Acarospora ochrophaea H. Magn. 1933
- Acarospora ortendahlii H.Magn.*
- Acarospora perexigua (Müll. Arg.) Hue 1909
- Acarospora porinoides (Stizenb.) Zahlbr. 1927
- Acarospora rhodesiae H. Magn. 1933
- Acarospora socialis H. Magn. 1929
- Acarospora steineri H. Magn. 1933
- Acarospora subbadia H. Magn. 1933
- Acarospora subochracea H. Magn. 1932
- Acarospora subtersa H. Magn. 1929
- Acarospora sulphurata var. austroafricana Zahlbr. 1926
- Acarospora tenuis (Vain.) H. Magn. 1929
- Acarospora tersa Zahlbr. [sic] probably (Fr.) J. Steiner 1897
  - Acarospora tersa var. bella (Ach.) Vain. ex Van der Byl 1931
  - Acarospora tersa var. tenuis Wain [sic] probably Vain. 1901
  - Acarospora tersa var. thaeodes Wain [sic] probably Vain. 1901
  - Acarospora tersa var. thaeodes Zahlbr.*
- Acarospora thaeodes A. Massal. 1861
- Acarospora xanthophana (Nyl.) Jatta 1906

Family: Acarosporaceae Zahlbr. 1906

Genus: Achorion Remak 1845

- Achorion schoenleinii Remak ex Guég. 1845, accepted as Trichophyton schoenleinii (Lebert) Langeron & Miloch. ex Nann., (1934)

Genus: Acremoniella Sacc. 1886

- Acremoniella sp.

Genus: Acremonium Link 1809

- Acremonium verticillatum Link 1809, accepted as Cladobotryum verticillatum (Link) S. Hughes, (1958)
- Acremonium sp.

Genus: Acrospeira Berk. & Broome 1857

- Acrospeira macrosporoidea (Berk. & Broome) Wiltshire 1938, accepted as Monodictys castaneae (Wallr.) S. Hughes, (1958)

Genus: Actinonema

- Actinonema rosae (Lib.) Fr. 1849, accepted as Diplocarpon rosae (Lib.) F.A. Wolf, (1912)

Genus: Actinopeltella

- Actinopeltella nitida Doidge 1924, accepted as Actinopeltis nitida (Doidge) Arx, (1962)

== Ae ==
Genus: Aecidium Pers. 1796, accepted as Puccinia Pers., (1794), (Rust fungi)

- Aecidium acalyphicolum Doidge*
- Aecidium acanthopsidis Syd. & P. Syd. 1915
- Aecidium albilabrum Kalchbr. 1871
- Aecidium albo-atrum P.Henn.*
- Aecidium anceps Syd. & P. Syd. 1901
- Aecidium ancylanthi Henn. 1903
- Aecidium antholyzae Bubak*
- Aecidium ari Desm. 1823 accepted as Puccinia sessilis J. Schröt., (1870) [1869]
- Aecidium aroideum Cooke 1879
- Aecidium australe Berk. 1843
- Aecidium banketense Hopk. 1938 recorded as Aecidium banketensis
- Aecidium barleriae Doidge 1948
- Aecidium baumanianum Henn. 1903,
- Aecidium baumii P.Henn.*
- Aecidium benguellense Lagerh. 1889
- Aecidium berkleyae Henn. & Pole-Evans 1908
- Aecidium bicolor Sacc. 1899
- Aecidium brideliae Henn. & Pole-Evans 1908
- Aecidium brunswigiae Henn. 1898
- Aecidium bulbines Henn. & Pole-Evans 1908
- Aecidium burtt-davyi Doidge 1939
- Aecidium bylianum Syd. 1924
- Aecidium capense Berk. & M.A. Curtis 1860
- Aecidium cardiospermi Cooke 1882 accepted as Dietelia cardiospermi (Cooke) Berndt & A.R. Wood, (2012)
- Aecidium cephalandrae Cooke 1884
- Aecidium cephalariae Syd. & P. Syd. 1912
- Aecidium chlorophyti Kalchbr. [sic] probably Har. & Pat. 1909
- Aecidium clarum Syd. & P. Syd. 1912
- Aecidium clematidis-brachiatae Doidge 1927
- Aecidium clerodendricola Henn. 1903
- Aecidium clutiae Doidge 1927 recorded as Aecidium cluytiae
- Aecidium compositarum DC. [sic], possibly Mart. 1817 accepted as Puccinia lapsanae Fuckel [as 'lampsanae'], (1860), or Rabenh. 1851
- Aecidium conyzae-pinnatilobatae P. Syd. & Syd. 1923
- Aecidium cookeanum De Toni 1888
- Aecidium corycii Doidge 1927
- Aecidium crini Kalchbr. 1882
- Aecidium crypticum Kalchbr. & Cooke 1880
- Aecidium cussoniae Kalchbr. 1882
- Aecidium davyi Syd. & P. Syd. 1912,
- Aecidium decipiens Syd. & P. Syd. 1923
- Aecidium denekiae Doidge 1927
- Aecidium dielsii Henn. 1902
- Aecidium dinteri Doidge 1939
- Aecidium diospyri A.L. Sm. 1898
- Aecidium dipcadi-viridis Doidge 1948
- Aecidium dissotidis Cooke 1882
- Aecidium doidgeae Syd. & P. Syd.(1912) recorded as Aecidium doidgei
- Aecidium dolichi Cooke 1882 accepted as Synchytrium dolichi (Cooke) Gäum., (1927)
- Aecidium dubiosum Syd. & P. Syd. 1901
- Aecidium elegans Dietel 1888 accepted as Endophyllum macowanii Pole-Evans as 'macowani' (1909) [1908]
- Aecidium elytropappi Henn. 1898 accepted as Endophyllum elytropappi (Henn.) A.R. Wood & Crous, (2005)
- Aecidium englerianum Henn. & Lindau 1893
- Aecidium eriospermi Henn. 1897
- Aecidium evansii Henn. 1908
- Aecidium fluggeae Doidge 1927
- Aecidium flustra Berk. ex Syd. & P. Syd. 1923
- Aecidium garckeanum Henn. 1891
- Aecidium gomphostigmae Doidge 1927
- Aecidium habunguense Henn. 1903 accepted as Puccinia agrophila Syd., (1937)
- Aecidium hartwegiae Thüm. 1877
- Aecidium helichrysi Doidge 1927
- Aecidium heliotropicola P.H.B. Talbot (1948) recorded as Aecidium heliotropicolum
- Aecidium hoffmanni P. Syd. & Syd. 1923
- Aecidium hibisci Cooke 1892
- Aecidium impatientis-capensis Doidge 1927
- Aecidium incertum Syd. & P. Syd. 1901
- Aecidium inornatum Kalchbr. 1882 accepted as Ravenelia inornata (Kalchbr.) Dietel, (1894)
- Aecidium ipomoeae Thüm. 1840 accepted as Albugo ipomoeae-panduratae (Schwein.) Swingle, (1892)
- Aecidium kakelense Henn. 1903
- Aecidium kraussiae P. Syd. & Syd. 1923
- Aecidium lebeckiae Henn. 1898
- Aecidium leguminosarum Rabenh. [sic] probably Opiz 1836, accepted as Uromyces viciae-fabae (Pers.) J. Schröt., (1875)
- Aecidium leiocarpum Syd. & P. Syd. 1917
- Aecidium leonotidis Henn. 1895 accepted as Puccinia leonotidis (Henn.) Arthur,(1921)
- Aecidium litakunense Doidge 1939
- Aecidium longaense Henn. 1903
- Aecidium loranthi Cooke 1885
- Aecidium macarangae P.Henn.*
- Aecidium macowanianum Thüm. 1875
- Aecidium macowanianum f. conyzae-pinnatilobatae Thüm. 1875 accepted as Endophyllum macowanianum (Thüm.) Pole-Evans, (1907)
- Aecidium menthae DC., (1815), accepted as Puccinia menthae Pers. (1801)
- Aecidium menyharthi Henn. 1906
- Aecidium metalasiae Syd. & P. Syd. 1912, accepted as Endophyllum metalasiae (Syd. & P. Syd.) A.R. Wood & Berndt, (2012)
- Aecidium moggii Doidge 1939
- Aecidium myrsiphylli Kalchbr. 1882
- Aecidium nestlerae Doidge 1948
- Aecidium nidorellae Doidge 1927
- Aecidium ornamentale Kalchbr. 1875 accepted as Ravenelia ornamentalis (Kalchbr.) Dietel, (1906)
- Aecidium ornithogaleum Bubák 1905, accepted as Puccinia hordei G.H.Otth (1871)[1870]
- Aecidium ornithogali Kalchbr. [sic] possibly *Aecidium ornithogaleum Bubák 1905,
- Aecidium osteospermi Doidge 1927 accepted as Endophyllum osteospermi (Doidge) A.R. Wood, (1998)
- Aecidium osyridicarpi Massee 1911 accepted as Puccinia osyridicarpi (Massee) Grove [as osyridocarpi], (1916)
- Aecidium oxalidis Thüm. 1876 accepted as Puccinia sorghi Schwein., (1832) [1834]
- Aecidium pachystigmae Doidge 1927,
- Aecidium pelargonii Thüm. 1877, accepted as Puccinia pelargonii (Thüm.) P. Syd. & Syd., (1904)
- Aecidium pentziae-globosae Doidge 1948
- Aecidium permultum Syd. & P. Syd. 1912
- Aecidium pienarii Doidge (1927)
- Aecidium plectranthi Barclay 1890 accepted as Coleosporium plectranthi (Barclay) Sacc., (1891)
- Aecidium plectroniae Cooke 1882
- Aecidium plectroniicola Henn. 1903
- Aecidium pottsii Doidge 1927
- Aecidium pretoriense Doidge 1927
- Aecidium pychnostachydis Syd. [sic] possibly Aecidium pycnostachydis (Kalchbr.) Doidge 1927,
- Aecidium rafniae MacOwan
- Aecidium ranunculacearum DC. 1815, accepted as Uromyces dactylidis G.H. Otth, (1861)
- Aecidium relhaniae Dippen. 1931
- Aecidium resinaecola (F. Rudolphi) G. Winter 1884 recorded as Aecidium resinicolum
- Aecidium resinaecola var. tumefaciens G. Winter 1884 recorded as Aecidium resinicolum var. tumefaciens
- Aecidium rhamni Pers. [sic] may be Aecidium rhamni J.F. Gmel. (1792), accepted as Puccinia coronata Corda (1837)
- Aecidium rhamni f. Rhamni prinoides Thuem.*
- Aecidium rhynchosiae Cooke 1882 accepted as Synchytrium dolichi (Cooke) Gäum., (1927)
- Aecidium royenae Cooke & Massee 1889
- Aecidium rubellum Pers. ex J.F. Gmel. 1792 accepted as Puccinia phragmitis (Schumach.) Tul., (1854)
- Aecidium rumicis f. Rumicis eckloniana Thuem.*
- Aecidium schlechterianum Henn. 1898
- Aecidium senecionis Desm. 1836
  - Aecidium senecionis f. Senecionis mikanoides Thuem.*
  - Aecidium senecionis f. Senecionis napifolii Thuem.*
  - Aecidium senecionis f. Senecionis quinquelobi Thuem.*
- Aecidium senecionum Desm.*
- Aecidium serrae Syd. & P. Syd. 1912
- Aecidium spinicolum [sic] Doidge Aecidium spinicola Doidge [as 'spinicolum'], (1948)
- Aecidium stobaeae [sic] Kalchbr. & Cooke 1879 Puccinia stobaeae MacOwan [as 'stobeae'], (1882)
- Aecidium talinophilum P. Syd. & Syd. 1923
- Aecidium tetragonii [sic] Doidge Aecidium tetragoniae Doidge, (1939)
- Aecidium thunbergiae Cooke 1882 accepted as Puccinia thunbergiae Cooke, (1882)
- Aecidium tinneae Henn. 1903
- Aecidium transvaaliae Henn. & Pole-Evans 1908
- Aecidium truncatum Kalchbr.
- Aecidium tubulosum Pat. & Gaillard 1889
- Aecidium tylophorae Cooke 1890
- Aecidium uleanum Pazschke 1892
- Aecidium urgineae Henn. & Pole-Evans 1908
- Aecidium urtica Schw. [sic] possibly one of: Aecidium urticae Schumach. 1803, acceprted as Puccinia urticata; Aecidium urticae DC. 1815; or Aecidium urticae Sawada 1944;
- Aecidium vangueriae Cooke 1882
- Aecidium vernoniae-monocephalae Doidge 1927
- Aecidium vernoniae-podocomae Doidge 1927
- Aecidium viborgiae [sic] P.Henn. Aecidium wiborgiae Henn. [as 'viborgiae'], (1898)
- Aecidium vignae Cooke
- Aecidium vitis A.L.Sm.
- Aecidium welwitschii Lagerh.
- Aecidium wiborgiae Henn. (1898) recorded as viborgiae
- Aecidium withaniae Thüm. 1877
- Aecidium woodianum Doidge 1927
- Aecidium sp.

Genus: Aegerita Pers. 1794,

- Aegerita penniseti Henn., (1904), accepted as Beniowskia sphaeroidea (Kalchbr. & Cooke) E.W. Mason, (1928)

== Ag ==
Family: Agaricaceae Chevall. 1826

Genus: Agaricus L. 1753

- Agaricus (Amanita) muscarius Linn, ex Fr. L. 1753, accepted as Amanita muscaria (L.) Lam., (1783)
- Agaricus (Amanita) praetorius Fr. 1838 basionym Agaricus praetorius Fr., (1838)
- Agaricus campestris L. 1753
- Agaricus comtulus Fr. 1838
- Agaricus dialeri (Bres. & Torrend) Sacc. & Trotter 1912 accepted as Leucoagaricus dialeri (Bres. & Torrend) D.A. Reid, (1975)
- Agaricus (Clitocybe) amarus (Alb. & Schwein.) Fr. 1821 accepted as Lepista amara (Alb. & Schwein.) Maire, (1930)
- Agaricus (Clitocybe) expallens Pers. 1801 accepted as Pseudoclitocybe expallens (Pers.) M.M. Moser, (1967)
- Agaricus (Clitocybe) fragrans Sow. ex Fr. [sic] Fr. 1815?
- Agaricus (Clitocybe) gentianeus Quel*
- Agaricus (Clitocybe) laccata [sic] Scop, ex Fr. probably Agaricus laccatus Scop., (1772)
- Agaricus (Clitocybe) membranaceus Fr. [sic] possibly one of; Agaricus membranaceus Hoffm. 1787; Agaricus membranaceus Scop. 1788, accepted as Homophron cernuum; Agaricus membranaceus Bolton 1788; Agaricus membranaceus Vahl 1790, accepted as Infundibulicybe gibba; Agaricus membranaceus Cooke & Massee 1892, accepted as Lepiota membranacea
- Agaricus (Clitocybe) sinopicus Fr. 1818 accepted as Bonomyces sinopicus (Fr.) Vizzini, (2014)
- Agaricus (Clitocybe) splendens Pers. 1801accepted as Paralepista splendens (Pers.) Vizzini, (2012)
- Agaricus (Clitocybe) trullaeformis Fr. Agaricus trulliformis Fr. [as 'trullaeformis'], (1821) accepted as Infundibulicybe trulliformis (Fr.) Gminder, (2016)
- Agaricus (Clitocybe) zizyphinus [sic] Vivian Agaricus ziziphina Viv., (1834) syn. Clitocybe ziziphina (Viv.) Sacc., (1887)
- Agaricus (Collybia) acervatus Fr. 1821accepted as Connopus acervatus (Fr.) K.W. Hughes, Mather & R.H. Petersen 2010
- Agaricus (Collybia) alveolatus Kalchbr. 1881accepted as Hymenopellis alveolata (Kalchbr.) R.H. Petersen [as alveolatus], (2010)
- Agaricus (Collybia) butyraceus Bull. 1792accepted as Rhodocollybia butyracea (Bull.) Lennox, (1979)
- Agaricus (Collybia) chortophilus Berk. 1843 accepted as Neoclitocybe chortophila (Berk.) D.A. Reid, (1975)
- Agaricus (Collybia) confluens Pers. 1796 accepted as Collybiopsis confluens (Pers.) R.H. Petersen,(2021)
- Agaricus (Collybia) dryophilus Bull. 1790 accepted as Gymnopus dryophilus (Bull.) Murrill, N. (1916)
- Agaricus (Collybia) extuberans Fr. 1838 accepted as Gymnopus ocior (Pers.) Antonín & Noordel., (1997)
- Agaricus (Collybia) homotrichus Berk. [sic] possibly Agaricus hemitrichus Pers. 1801, accepted as Cortinarius hemitrichus (Pers.) Fr., (1838)
- Agaricus (Collybia) macilentus Fr. 1821 accepted as Agaricus macilentus Fr., (1821)
- Agaricus (Collybia) melinosarcus Kalchbr. 1876 accepted as Agaricus melinosarcus Kalchbr., 1876)
- Agaricus (Collybia) radicatus Relhan 1786 accepted as Hymenopellis radicata (Relhan) R.H. Petersen, (2010)
- Agaricus (Collybia) radicatus var. brachypus Kalchbr. 1881 accepted as Hymenopellis radicata (Relhan) R.H. Petersen, (2010)
- Agaricus (Collybia) stridulus Fr. 1870 accepted as Melanoleuca stridula (Fr.) Singer, (1943)
- Agaricus (Collybia) velutipes Fr. [sic] possibly Curtis 1782, accepted as Flammulina velutipes (Curtis) Singer, (1951) [1949]
- Agaricus (Coprinus) ephemerus Bull. 1786 accepted as Coprinellus ephemerus (Bull.) Redhead, Vilgalys & Moncalvo, (2001)
- Agaricus (Crepidotus) applanatus Pers. 1796 accepted as Crepidotus applanatus (Pers.) P. Kumm., (1871)
- Agaricus (Crepidotus) episphaeria Berk. 1846 accepted as Agaricus episphaeria Berk. 1846
- Agaricus (Crepidotus) inandae Cooke 1890 accepted as Agaricus inandae Cooke 1890
- Agaricus (Crepidotus) pogonatus Kalchbr. 1881 accepted as Agaricus pogonatus Kalchbr. 1881
- Agaricus (Crepidotus) proteus Kalchbr. 1876 accepted as Melanotus proteus (Sacc.) Singer, (1946)
- Agaricus (Crepidotus) scalaris var. lobulatus Kalchbr. 1881 Agaricus scalaris var. lobulatus Kalchbr., (1881)
- Agaricus cretaceus Fr. [sic]*
- Agaricus (Entoloma) sagittaeformis Kalchbr. & Cooke (Agaricus sagittiformis Kalchbr. & Cooke [as sagittaeformis], (1881) accepted as Termitomyces sagittiformis (Kalchbr. & Cooke) D.A. Reid [as sagittaeformis], (1975)
- Agaricus (Flammula) alnicola Fr. 1821 accepted as Flammula alnicola (Fr.) P. Kumm., (1871)
- Agaricus (Flammula) flavidus Schaeff. 1774 accepted as Pholiota flavida (Schaeff.) Singer, (1951) [1949]
- Agaricus (Flammula) harmoge Fr. 1838 accepted as Agaricus harmoge Fr. 1838
- Agaricus (Flammula) janus Berk. & Br. accepted as Agaricus janus Berk. & Broome 1871
- Agaricus (Flammula) tilopus Kalchbr. & MacOwan 1881accepted as Pholiota tilopus (Kalchbr. & MacOwan) D.A. Reid, (1975)
- Agaricus (Galera) eatoni Berk. 1876accepted as Agaricus eatonii Berk. 1876
- Agaricus (Galera) hypnorum Schrank 1789 accepted as Galerina hypnorum (Schrank) Kühner, (1935)
- Agaricus (Galera) peroxydatus Berk. 1843 accepted as Conocybe peroxydata (Berk.) D.A. Reid, (1975)
- Agaricus (Galera) tener Schaeff. 1774 accepted as Conocybe tenera (Schaeff.) Kühner, (1935)
- Agaricus (Hebeloma) spoliatus Fr. 1838 accepted as Hebeloma spoliatum (Fr.) Gillet, [1878]
- Agaricus (Hypholoma) candolleanus Fr. 1818 accepted as Psathyrella candolleana (Fr.) Maire, (1937)
- Agaricus (Hypholoma) capnolepis Kalchbr. 1881 accepted as Agaricus capnolepis Kalchbr., (1881)
- Agaricus (Hypholoma) fascicularis Huds. 1778 accepted as Hypholoma fasciculare (Huds.) P. Kumm., (1871)
- Agaricus (Lepiota) africamus Kalchbr. [sic] possibly Agaricus africanus (Fayod) Sacc. 1895
- Agaricus (Lepiota) atricapillus Cooke & Massee 1888 accepted as Agaricus atricapillus Cooke & Massee 1888
- Agaricus (Lepiota) cuculliformis Fr. 1849 accepted as Agaricus cuculliformis Fr. 1849
- Agaricus (Lepiota) excoriatus Schaeff. 1774 accepted as Macrolepiota excoriata (Schaeff.) Wasser, (1978)
- Agaricus (Lepiota) kunzei Fr. 1849 accepted as Agaricus kunzei Fr., (1849) [1848]
- Agaricus (Lepiota) magnannulatus Kalchbr. 1881 accepted as Agaricus magnannulatus Kalchbr. 1881
- Agaricus (Lepiota) montagnei Kalchbr. 1881 accepted as Agaricus montagnei Kalchbr. 1881
- Agaricus (Lepiota) polysarcos Kalchbr. & MacOwan (1881)accepted as Agaricus polysarcos Kalchbr. & MacOwan, (1881)
- Agaricus (Lepiota) procerus Scop, 1772 accepted as Agaricus procerus Scop., (1772)
- Agaricus (Lepiota) pteropus Kalchbr. & MacOwan 1880 accepted as Agaricus pleropus Kalchbr. & MacOwan [as pteropus], (1880)
- Agaricus (Lepiota) rubricatus Berk. & Br. 1871 accepted as Agaricus rubricatus Berk. & Broome, (1871)
- Agaricus (Lepiota) sulfurellus Kalchbr. & MacOwan accepted as Agaricus sulfurellus Kalchbr. 1879
- Agaricus (Lepiota) various Kalchbr. & MacOwan. [sic] possibly one of: Agaricus varius Schaeff., (1774) accepted as Cortinarius varius (Schaeff.) Fr., (1838) [1836-1838] or Agaricus varius Bolton,(1788) accepted as Panaeolus fimicola (Pers.) Gillet, (1878)
- Agaricus (Lepiota) zeyheri Berk. 1843 accepted as Leucocoprinus zeyheri (Berk.) Singer, (1943)
  - Agaricus (Lepiota) zeyheri var. telosus Kalchbr. & MacOwan 1881
  - Agaricus (Lepiota) zeyheri var. verrucellosus Kalchbr. [sic] possibly Miq. ex Kalchbr. 1881
- Agaricus muscarius Linn. 1753 accepted as Amanita muscaria (L.) Lam., (1783)
- Agaricus (Mycena) actiniceps Kalchbr. & Cooke 1881 accepted as Marasmius actiniceps (Kalchbr. & Cooke) D.A. Reid, (1975)
- Agaricus (Mycena) argutus Kalchbr. 1881 Agaricus argutus Kalchbr., (1881)
- Agaricus (Mycena) capillaris Schumach. 1803 accepted as Mycena capillaris (Schumach.) P. Kumm., (1871)
- Agaricus (Mycena) clavicularis Fr. 1821 accepted as Mycena clavicularis (Fr.) Gillet, (1876) [1878]
- Agaricus (Mycena) corticola Fr. 1821 accepted as Mycena clavicularis (Fr.) Gillet, (1876) [1878]
- Agaricus (Mycena) debilis Fr. 1838 Agaricus debilis Fr. 1838
- Agaricus (Mycena) dilatatus Fr. 1815 accepted as Mycena stylobates (Pers.) P. Kumm., (1871)
- Agaricus (Mycena) dregeanus Lév. 1846 Agaricus dregeanus Lév. 1846
- Agaricus (Mycena) galeropsis Fr. 1877 Agaricus galeropsis Fr. 1877
- Agaricus (Mycena) heliscus Berk. & Broome 1871 accepted as Gloiocephala helisca (Berk. & Broome) Pegler, (1986)
- Agaricus (Mycena) hiemalis Osbeck 1788 accepted as Phloeomana hiemalis (Osbeck) Redhead, (2016)
- Agaricus (Mycena) macrorrhizus Fr. 1848 Agaricus macrorrhizus Fr. 1848
- Agaricus (Mycena) rhodiophyllus Kalchbr. 1881 Agaricus rhodiophyllus Kalchbr. 1881
- Agaricus (Mycena) sciolus Kalchbr. 1881 Agaricus sciolus Kalchbr. 1881
- Agaricus (Mycena) tintinnabulum (Paulet) Fr. 1838 Agaricus tintinnabulum (Paulet) Fr. 1838
- Agaricus (Mycena) vitreus Fr. 1821 Mycena vitrea (Fr.) Quél., (1872)
- Agaricus (Naucoria) arenicola Berk. 1843 accepted as Agrocybe pediades (Fr.) Fayod, (1889)
- Agaricus (Naucoria) furfuraceus Pers. 1801 accepted as Tubaria furfuracea (Pers.) Gillet, (1876) [1878]
- Agaricus (Naucoria) pediades Fr. 1821 accepted as Agrocybe pediades (Fr.) Fayod, (1889)
- Agaricus (Naucoria) pygmaeus Bull. 1791 accepted as Psathyrella pygmaea (Bull.) Singer, (1951) [1949]
- Agaricus (Naucoria) semiorbicularis Bull. 1789 accepted as Agrocybe pediades (Fr.) Fayod, (1889)
- Agaricus (Naucoria) undulosus Jungh. [sic] possibly Agaricus undulosus Fr., (1838) [1836-1838]
- Agaricus (Nolanea) castus MacOwan 1881 accepted as Mycena casta (MacOwan) D.A. Reid, (1975)
- Agaricus (Omphalia) griseo-pallidus Desm. (1826) accepted as Arrhenia griseopallida (Desm.) Watling, (1989) [1988]
- Agaricus (Omphalia) integrellus Pers. 1800 accepted as Delicatula integrella (Pers.) Fayod, (1889)
- Agaricus (Omphalia) linopus Kalchbr. 1881 accepted as Agaricus linopus Kalchbr., (1881)
- Agaricus (Omphalia) micromeles Berk. & Broome 1871 accepted as Agaricus micromeles Berk. & Broome, (1871)
- Agaricus (Omphalia) paurophyllus Berk. 1876 accepted as Agaricus paurophyllus Berk., (1876)
- Agaricus (Omphalia) polypus Kalchbr. 1877 accepted as Marasmius polypus (Kalchbr.) D.A. Reid, (1975)
- Agaricus (Omphalia) rusticus Fr. 1838 accepted as Arrhenia rustica (Fr.) Redhead, Lutzoni, Moncalvo & Vilgalys, (2002)
- Agaricus (Omphalia) scyphiformis Fr. 1818 accepted as Agaricus scyphiformis Fr., (1818)
- Agaricus (Omphalia) scyphoides Fr. 1821 accepted as Clitopilus scyphoides (Fr.) Singer, (1946)
- Agaricus (Omphalia) syndesmius Kalchbr. 1881 accepted as Agaricus syndesmius Kalchbr., (1881)
- Agaricus (Omphalia) umbelliferus Linn, ex Fr. var. cinnabarinus Berk. [sic] possibly Agaricus umbellifer L., (1753) (Checked to here on Index Fungorum)
- Agaricus (Panaeolus) caliginosus Jungh. 1830 accepted as Agaricus caliginosus Jungh., (1830)
- Agaricus (Panaeolus) campanulatis L. 1753 accepted as Panaeolus papilionaceus (Bull.) Quél., (1872)
- Agaricus (Panaeolus) fimicolus [sic] Fr. accepted as Agaricus fimicola Fr., (1821)
- Agaricus (Panaeolus) papilionaceus Bull. 1781 accepted as Panaeolus papilionaceus (Bull.) Quél., (1872)
- Agaricus (Panaeolus) separatum Linn, ex Fr. Agaricus separatus L. 1753 accepted as Panaeolus semiovatus (Sowerby) S. Lundell & Nannf. (1938)
- Agaricus (Pholiota) aurivellus Batsch ex Fr.*
- Agaricus (Pholiota) mycenoides Fr.*
- Agaricus (Pholiota) spectabilis Fr. [sic] possibly Weinm. 1824, accepted as Gymnopilus junonius (Fr.) P.D. Orton, (1960)
- Agaricus (Pholiota) togularis Bull, 1793 accepted as Agrocybe praecox (Pers.) Fayod, (1889)
- Agaricus (Pholiota) unicolor Vahl 1792 accepted as Galerina marginata (Batsch) Kühner, (1935)
- Agaricus (Pleurotus) atrocaeruleus Fr. accepted as Agaricus atrocoeruleus Fr. [as atrocœruleus], (1815), accepted as Hohenbuehelia atrocoerulea (Fr.) Singer [as atrocaerulea], (1951) [1949]
- Agaricus (Pleurotus) aureo-tomentosus Kalchbr. Agaricus aureotomentosus Kalchbr. [as aureo-tomentosus], (1880)
- Agaricus (Pleurotus) caveatus Berk. & M.A. Curtis 1868, accepted as Crepidotus caveatus (Berk. & M.A. Curtis) Murrill, (1916)
- Agaricus (Pleurotus) clusilis Kalchbr. 1880 accepted as Marasmiellus clusilis (Sacc.) D.A. Reid, (1975)
- Agaricus (Pleurotus) contrarius Kalchbr. 1881 accepted as Marasmiellus contrarius (Sacc.) D.A. Reid, (1975)
- Agaricus (Pleurotus) flahellatus Berk. & Broome 1871, accepted as Pleurotus flabellatus Sacc., (1887)
- Agaricus (Pleurotus) gilvescens Kalchbr. 1881 accepted as Agaricus gilvescens Kalchbr. 1881
- Agaricus (Pleurotus) limpidus Fr. 1838 accepted as Agaricus limpidus Fr., (1838) [1836-1838]
- Agaricus (Pleurotus) olearius DC. 1815 accepted as Omphalotus olearius (DC.) Singer, (1948) [1946]
- Agaricus (Pleurotus) perpusillus Fr. [sic] possibly Agaricus perpusillus Lumn. 1791
- Agaricus (Pleurotus) radiatim-plicatus Kalchbr. 1881 accepted as Marasmiellus radiatim-plicatus (Kalchbr.) D.A. Reid, (1975)
- Agaricus (Pleurotus) sciadeum [sic] Kalchbr. & MacOwan 1881 Agaricus sciadeum Kalchbr. & MacOwan 1881, accepted as Hohenbuehelia sciadium (Kalchbr. & MacOwan) Singer [as sciadea], (1951) [1949]
- Agaricus (Pleurotus) sciadeum [sic] var. salmoneus Kalchbr. & MacOwan, (1881) accepted as Phyllotopsis salmonea (Kalchbr. & MacOwan) D.A. Reid [as Phylotopis salmoneus], (1975)
- Agaricus (Pleurotus) septicus Fr. 1821 accepted as Agaricus septicus Fr., (1821)
- Agaricus (Pleurotus) striatulus Fr. [sic] nay be one of: Agaricus striatulus J.F. Gmel. 1792, accepted as Gloeophyllum striatum (Fr.) Murrill, Bull. (1905); Agaricus striatulus Pers. 1801, accepted as Resupinatus striatulus (Pers.) Murrill, (1915) or Agaricus striatulus Schumach. 1803
- Agaricus (Pluteus) cervinus Schaeff. 1774 accepted as Pluteus cervinus (Schaeff.) P. Kumm., (1871)
- Agaricus (Psalliota) arvensis Schaeff. 1774 accepted as Agaricus arvensis Schaeff., (1774)
- Agaricus (Psalliota) arvensis var. grossus Berk.*
- Agaricus (Psalliota) campestris L. 1753 accepted as Agaricus campestris L. [as campester], (1753)
- Agaricus (Psalliota) campestris (b) praticola. probably Agaricus campestris var. praticola Vittad. ex Fr. 1838, accepted as Agaricus campestris L. [as campester], (1753)
- Agaricus (Psalliota) pratensis var. australis Berk. 1843 accepted as Cuphophyllus pratensis(Pers.) Bon, (1985) [1984]
- Agaricus (Psalliota) sylvaticus Schaeff. 1774 accepted as Agaricus sylvaticus Schaeff., (1774)
- Agaricus (Psathyra) corrugis Pers. 1794 accepted as Psathyrella corrugis (Pers.) Konrad & Maubl., (1949) [1948]
- Agaricus (Psathyra) spadiceo-griseus Schaeff. 1774 accepted as Psathyrella spadiceogrisea (Schaeff.) Maire, (1937)
- Agaricus (Psathyrella) disseminatus Pers. 1801 accepted as Coprinellus disseminatus (Pers.) J.E. Lange [as disseminata], (1938)
- Agaricus (Psathyrella) gracilis Fr. 1821, accepted as Psathyrella corrugis (Pers.) Konrad & Maubl., (1949) [1948]
- Agaricus (Psathyrella) pronus Fr. 1838 accepted as Psathyrella prona (Fr.) Gillet, (1878)
- Agaricus (Psathyrella) subtilis Fr. 1821 accepted as Agaricus subtilis Fr., (1821)
- Agaricus (Psathyrella) sp.
- Agaricus (Psilocybe) atrorufus Schaeff. 1774 accepted as Deconica montana (Pers.) P.D. Orton, (1960)
- Agaricus (Psilocybe) atrorufus var. montanus Pers. ex Fr.*
- Agaricus (Psilocybe) ericaeus Pers. 1801 accepted as Hypholoma ericaeum (Pers.) Kühner, Bull. (1936)
- Agaricus (Psilocybe) foenisecii Pers. 1800 accepted as Panaeolina foenisecii (Pers.) Maire, (1933)
- Agaricus (Psilocybe) semilanceatus Fr. 1818 accepted as Psilocybe semilanceata (Fr.) P. Kumm., (1871)
- Agaricus (Psilocybe) squalens Fr. 1838 accepted as Agaricus squalens Fr.,(1838) [1836-1838]
- Agaricus (Psilocybe) taediosus Kalchbr. 1880 accepted as Stropharia taediosa (Kalchbr.) D.A. Reid, (1975)
- Agaricus (Psilocybe) udus Pers. 1801 accepted as Bogbodia uda (Pers.) Redhead, (2013)
- Agaricus purpuratus Kalchbr. var. cinerea possibly Agaricus purpuratus Cooke & Massee 1890
- Agaricus (Schulzeria) umkowaani Cooke & Massee, 1889 accepted as Termitomyces umkowaan (Cooke & Massee) D.A. Reid [as umkowaani], (1975)
- Agaricus (Stropharia) melaspermus Bull, ex Fr. [sic] possibly Agaricus melaspermus Fr., (1838) [1836-1838]
- Agaricus (Stropharia) obturatus Fr. 1821 accepted as Psilocybe coronilla (Bull.) Noordel., (1995)
- Agaricus (Stropharia) olivaceo-flava Kalchbr. & MacOwan accepted as Agaricus olivaceoflavus Kalchbr. & MacOwan [as olivaceo-flavus], (1881)
- Agaricus (Stropharia) semiglobatus Batsch 1786 accepted as Protostropharia semiglobata (Batsch) Redhead, Moncalvo & Vilgalys, (2013)
- Agaricus (Tricholoma) caffrorum Kalchbr. & MacOwan 1881 accepted as Lepista caffrorum (Kalchbr. & MacOwan) Singer, (1951) [1949]
- Agaricus (Tricholoma) caffrorum var. sulonensis Kalchbr. & MacOwan 1881 accepted as Lepista caffrorum (Kalchbr. & MacOwan) Singer, (1951) [1949]
- Agaricus (Tricholoma) georgii Clus. ex Fr. possibly L. 1753, accepted as Calocybe gambosa (Fr.) Donk, (1962)
- Agaricus (Tricholoma) melaleucus var. porphyroleucus (Bull.) Fr. 1821 accepted as Melanoleuca polioleuca (Fr.) Kühner & Maire, Bull. (1934)
- Agaricus (Tricholoma) ustalis Fr. 1818 accepted as Tricholoma ustale (Fr.) P. Kumm., (1871)
- Agaricus (Volvaria) bombycinus Schaeff. 1774 accepted as Volvariella bombycina (Schaeff.) Singer, (1951) [1949]

== Ai ==
Genus: Aithaloderma Syd. & P. Syd. 1913

- Aithaloderma capense [as capensis] Doidge 1927 accepted as Chaetothyrium capense (Doidge) Hansf. (1950)

== Al ==
Genus: Alectoria Ach. 1809?(lichens)

- Alectoria chalybeiformis (L.) Röhl. 1813 f. terrestris Stizenb. 1890
- Alectoria jubata (L.) Ach. 1810
- Alectoria usneoides (Ach.) Ach. 1810 accepted as Ramalina usnea (L.) R. Howe, (1914)

Genus: Aleurodiscus

- Aleurodiscus acerinus (Pers.) Höhn. & Litsch. 1907 accepted as Dendrothele acerina (Pers.) P.A. Lemke, (1965)
- Aleurodiscus acerinus var. longisporus Höhn. & Litsch. 1907 accepted as Dendrothele acerina (Pers.) P.A. Lemke, (1965)
- Aleurodiscus capensis Lloyd 1920 accepted as Aleurocystis capensis (Lloyd) Lloyd,(1920) [1921]
- Aleurodiscus cerussatus [as cerrussatus] (Bres.) Höhn. & Litsch. 1907
- Aleurodiscus corneus Lloyd 1920,
- Aleurodiscus disciformis (DC.) Pat. 1894

Genus: Allantonectria Earle 1901, accepted as Thyronectria Sacc., (1875), Sordariomycetes

- Allantonectria miltina (Durieu & Mont.) Weese 1910

Genus: Allarthothelium (Vain.) Zahlbr. 1908, accepted as Arthonia Ach., (1806) (Ramalinaceae C. Agardh [as 'Ramalineae'], (1821)

- Allarthothelium minimum Vain. 1926, accepted as Bilimbia minima (Vain.) Räsänen, (1943)

Genus: Allomyces E.J. Butler 1911

- Allomyces arbusculus E.J. Butler 1911

Genus: Aloysiella Mattir. & Sacc. 1908, accepted as Metacapnodium Speg., (1918)

- Aloysiella ruwenzorensis Mattir. & Sacc. 1908

Genus: Alternaria Nees 1816

- Alternaria allii Nolla. (1927), accepted as Alternaria solani Sorauer, (1896)
- Alternaria brassicae (Berk.) Sacc. 1880
- Alternaria brassicae f. phaseoli [as var. phaseoli] Brunaud 1894 accepted as Alternaria brassicae (Berk.) Sacc., (1880)
- Alternaria circinans (Berk. & M.A. Curtis) P.C. Bolle 1924 accepted as Alternaria brassicicola (Schwein.) Wiltshire, (1947)
- Alternaria citri Ellis & N. Pierce 1902
- Alternaria crassa (Sacc.) Rands (1917)
- Alternaria cucumerina (Ellis & Everh.) J.A. Elliott 1917
- Alternaria dianthi F. Stevens & J.G. Hall 1909
- Alternaria gossypina (Thüm.) J.C.F. Hopkins 1931
- Alternaria herculea (Ellis & G. Martin) J.A. Elliott (1917),accepted as Alternaria brassicae (Berk.) Sacc., (1880)
- Alternaria longipes Tisd. & Wadk [sic] possibly (Ellis & Everh.) E.W. Mason 1928,
- Alternaria macrospora Zimm. (1904),
- Alternaria macrospora (group) possibly accepted as Alternaria brassicae (Berk.) Sacc. (1880)
- Alternaria solani (Ellis & G. Martin) L.R. Jones & Grout 1896
- Alternaria solani (group)
- Alternaria tabacina (Ellis & Everh.) Hori (1903)
- Alternaria tenuis Nees (1817), accepted as Alternaria alternata (Fr.) Keissl. (1912)
- Alternaria violae L.D. Galloway & Dorsett 1900
- Alternaria sp.

== Am ==
Genus: Amanita

- Amanita mappa Quel. [sic] possibly (Batsch) Bertill. 1866, accepted as Amanita citrina Pers., Tent. (1797)
- Amanita muscaria S.F.Gray [sic] possibly (L.) Lam., (1783)
- Amanita pantherina Quel [sic] possibly (DC.) Krombh. 1846
- Amanita phalloides Secr. 1833
- Amanita rubescens (Pers. ex Fr.) Gray (1797) possibly Pers. 1797
- Amanita solitaria Secr [sic]

Genus: Amanitopsis Roze accepted as Amanita Pers. (1794)

- Amanitopsis praetoria (Fr.) Sacc. 1887 basionym Agaricus praetorius Fr. 1838

Family: Amaurochaetaceae Rostaf. ex Cooke 1877

Genus: Amaurochaete Rostaf. 1873

- Amaurochaete fuliginosa (Sowerby) T. Macbr. 1899,

Genus: Amauroderma Murrill, (1905)

- Amauroderma argenteofulvum (Van der Byl) Doidge 1950
- Amauroderma fuscoporia Wakef. 1948 accepted as Amauroderma fuscoporium Wakef. [as 'fuscoporia'], (1948)
- Amauroderma rugosum Lloyd [sic] possibly (Blume & T. Nees) Torrend 1920, accepted as Sanguinoderma rugosum (Blume & T. Nees) Y.F. Sun, D.H. Costa & B.K. Cui, (2020)

Genus: Amazonia Theiss. 1913

- Amazonia asterinoides (G. Winter) Theiss. 1913,
- Amazonia goniomae Doidge 1924

Genus: Amphiloma Nyl. (1855), accepted as Lepraria Ach. (1803)

- Amphiloma elegans (Link) Körb. 1855 accepted as Xanthoria elegans (Link) Th. Fr., (1860)
- Amphiloma elegantissimum (Nyl.) Müll. Arg. 1888, accepted as Stellarangia elegantissima (Nyl.) Frödén, Arup & Søchting, (2013)
- Amphiloma eudoxum Müll. Arg. 1888, accepted as Teloschistopsis eudoxa (Müll. Arg.) Frödén, Arup & Søchting, (2013)
- Amphiloma leucoxanthum Müll. Arg. 1888

== An ==
Genus: Anaptychia Körb. 1848

- Anaptychia corallophora Wain. [sic] probably Anaptychia coralliphora (Taylor) Zahlbr. [as 'corallophora'], (1931), accepted as Polyblastidium corallophorum (Taylor) Kalb, (2015)
- Anaptychia dactyliza (Nyl.) Zahlbr. 1924
- Anaptychia granulifera (Ach.) A. Massal. 1853
- Anaptychia hypoleuca (Ach.) A. Massal. 1860, accepted as Polyblastidium hypoleucum (Ach.) Kalb, (2015)
- Anaptychia hypoleuca var. colorata Zahlbr. 1927
- Anaptychia leucomela Massal. Anaptychia leucomelos (L.) A. Massal. [as 'leucomela'], (1890) accepted as Leucodermia leucomelos (L.) Kalb, (2015)
- Anaptychia leucomelaena Vain.*
- Anaptychia leucomelaena var. angustifolia Müll.Arg. possibly Anaptychia leucomelos var. angustifolia (Meyen & Flot.) Müll. Arg., (1894) accepted as
- Anaptychia leucomelaena var. multifida f. squarrosa Vain. possibly Anaptychia leucomelos f. squarrosa Vain. [as Anaptychia leucomelaena f. squarrosa], (1901) or Anaptychia leucomelos var. multifida (Meyen & Flot.) Vain., (1890)
- Anaptychia obesa f. caesiocrocata (Nyl.) Zahlbr. 1931
- Anaptychia palpebrata (Taylor) Vain. 1898
- Anaptychia podocarpa (Bél.) A. Massal. 1860 accepted as Heterodermia podocarpa (Bél.) D.D. Awasthi, (1973)
- Anaptychia speciosa (Wulfen) A. Massal. 1853 accepted as Heterodermia speciosa (Wulfen) Trevis., (1868)
- Anaptychia speciosa f. sorediosa (Müll. Arg.) Zahlbr. 1931
- Anaptychia speciosa var. esorediata Vain. 1901
- Anaptychia speciosa var. lobulifera Vain. 1901

Genus: Anelleria

- Anelleria separata Karst.*

Genus: Angelina Fr. 1849

- Angelina nigrocinnabarina (Schwein.) Berk. & M.A. Curtis 1868 accepted as Blitridium nigrocinnabarinum (Schwein.) Sacc., (1889)

Genus: Antennaria Link 1809

- Antennaria (Goleroa) engleriana v.Hohn.*

Genus: Anthostomella Sacc. 1875

- Anthostomella africana Berl. & Vogl. [sic] possibly (Kalchbr. & Cooke) Sacc. 1882
- Anthostomella capensis Doidge 1948
- Anthostomella cassinopsidis Rehm 1906
- Anthostomella cassinopsidis (Kalchbr. & Cooke) Petr. & Syd. 1925
- Anthostomella nigroannulata Sacc. 1882
- Anthostomella salaciae Doidge 1948

Genus: Anthracophyllum Ces. 1879

- Anthracophyllum nigritum (Lév.) Kalchbr., (1881)as Anthracophyllum nigrita

Genus: Anthracothecium Hampe ex A. Massal. 1860

- Anthracothecium biferum Zahlbr. 1932
- Anthracothecium duplicans (Nyl.) Müll. Arg. 1880 accepted as Pyrenula duplicans (Nyl.) Aptroot, (2008)
- Anthracothecium pyrenuloides (Mont.) Müll. Arg. 1880 accepted as Pyrenula pyrenuloides (Mont.) R.C. Harris, (1989),
- Anthracothecium thelomorphum (Tuck.) Zahlbr. (1922) [as thelemorphum]
- Anthracothecium thwaitesii(Leight.) Müll. Arg. 1880
- Anthracothecium variolosum (Pers.) Müll. Arg. 1880

Genus: Anthurus Kalchbr. & MacOwan 1880

- Anthurus archeri (Berk.) E.Fisch.,(1886) accepted as Clathrus archeri (Berk.) Dring 1980
- Anthurus macowani Marloth 1913
- Anthurus woodii MacOwan 1880

== Ap ==
Genus: Aphysa Theiss. & Syd. 1917, accepted as Coleroa Rabenh., (1850)

- Aphysa lebeckiae (Verwoerd & Dippen.) Doidge 1942, accepted as Coleroa lebeckiae (Verwoerd & Dippen.) Arx, (1962)
- Aphysa rhynchosiae (Kalchbr. & Cooke) Theiss. & Syd. 1917, accepted as Coleroa rhynchosiae (Kalchbr. & Cooke) E. Müll., (1962)
- Aphysa senniana (Sacc.) Doidge 1941, accepted as Coleroa senniana (Sacc.) Arx, (1962)

Genus: Appendiculella Höhn. 1919

- Appendiculella calostroma (Desm.) Höhn. 1919

== Ar ==
Family: Arachniaceae Coker & Couch 1928

Genus: Arachnion Schwein. 1822

- Arachnion alborosellum Verwoerd 1926 [as alborosella]
- Arachnion album Schwein. 1822
- Arachnion firmoderma Verwoerd 1926
- Arachnion giganteum Lloyd*
- Arachnion scleroderma Lloyd 1915

Genus: Arcangeliella Cavara 1900 accepted as Lactarius Pers., (1797)

- Arcangeliella africana (Lloyd) Zeller & C.W. Dodge 1935 accepted as Neosecotium africanum (Lloyd) Singer & A.H. Sm., (1960)

Genus: Arctomia Th. Fr. 1861 (lichens)

- Arctomia muscicola A.L. Sm. 1932

Genus: Armillaria (Fr.) Staude 1857

- Armillaria mellea Quel. [sic] possibly (Vahl) P. Kumm. 1871
- Armillaria ramentacea Quel. [sic] possibly (Bull. ex Pers.) Gillet 1874, accepted as Tricholoma ramentaceum (Bull. ex Pers.) Ricken, (1915)

Genus: Arrhenia Fr. 1849

- Arrhenia cucullata [sic]

Family: Arthoniaceae Rchb. 1841

Genus: Arthonia Ach. 1806

- Arthonia albida (Müll. Arg.) Willey 1890
- Arthonia angulata Fée 1837
- Arthonia angulosa Müll. Arg. 1887
- Arthonia antillarum (Fée) Nyl. 1867
- Arthonia argentea Stizenb. 1891
- Arthonia calospora Müll. Arg. 1882
- Arthonia capensis Stizenb. 1891 accepted as Tryblidaria capensis (Stizenb.) Vouaux, (1914)
- Arthonia cinnabarina (DC.) Wallr. 1831 accepted as Coniocarpon cinnabarinum DC., (1805)
- Arthonia circumscissa Merrill [sic]possibly Vain. 1890, accepted as Cyclographina circumscissa (Vain.) Makhija & Patw., (1995)
- Arthonia consanguinea (Müll. Arg.) Willey 1890
- Arthonia dispersa Nyl. [sic] possibly (Schrad.) Dufour 1818, accepted as Naevia dispersa (Schrad.) Thiyagaraja, Lücking & K.D. Hyde, (2020) or Arthonia dispersa subsp. excipienda (Nyl.) Nyl. 1861
- Arthonia fusconigra Nyl. 1859
- Arthonia gregaria (Weigel) Körb. 1855 accepted as Coniocarpon cinnabarinum DC., (1805)
- Arthonia hormidiella Stirt. 1877
- Arthonia lecideicarpa Zahlbr. 1932
- Arthonia melanopsis Stirt. 1877
- Arthonia nana Stizenb. 1891
- Arthonia oblongula Müll. Arg. 1887
- Arthonia obvelata (Müll. Arg.) Willey 1890
- Arthonia palmicola Ach. 1814
- Arthonia platygraphidea Nyl. 1863
- Arthonia polymorpha Ach. 1814
- Arthonia propinqua Nyl. 1863
- Arthonia pyrenuloides Müll. Arg. 1887
- Arthonia rubrofuscescens Vain. 1926
- Arthonia variabilis Müll. Arg. 1887
- Arthonia violascens Flot. ex Nyl.
- Arthonia wilmsiana Müll. Arg. 1886

Genus: Arthopyrenia A. Massal. 1852

- Arthopyrenia alboatra Müll. Arg. 1883
- Arthopyrenia capensis Zahlbr. 1921
- Arthopyrenia cinchonae (Ach.) Müll. Arg. 1883
- Arthopyrenia cinchonae var. fumida (Stizenb.) Zahlbr. 1921 accepted as Constrictolumina cinchonae (Ach.) Lücking, M.P. Nelsen & Aptroot, (2016)
- Arthopyrenia fallax (Nyl.) Arnold 1873 accepted as Pseudosagedia fallax (Nyl.) Oxner, (1956)
- Arthopyrenia knysnana Zahlbr. 1932
- Arthopyrenia leucanthes (Stirt.) Zahlbr. 1922
- Arthopyrenia norata A. Massal. 1861
- Arthopyrenia paraphysata Zahlbr. 1932
- Arthopyrenia pruinosogrisea (C. Knight) Müll. Arg. 1894
- Arthopyrenia recepta Müll. Arg. 1883
- Arthopyrenia simulans Müll. Arg. 1887

Genus: Arthothelium A. Massal. 1852 (Lichens)

- Arthothelium abnorme (Ach.) Müll. Arg. 1880
- Arthothelium albidum Müll. Arg. 1887
- Arthothelium album Zahlbr. 1932
- Arthothelium argenteum (Stizenb.) Zahlbr. 1922
- Arthothelium consanguineum Müll. Arg. 1888
- Arthothelium fusconigrum (Nyl.) Müll. Arg. 1894
- Arthothelium melanopsis (Stirt.) Zahlbr. 1922
- Arthothelium michylum Vain. 1922
- Arthothelium obvelatum Müll. Arg. 1887
- Arthothelium phaeosporum Zahlbr. 1936
- Arthothelium psyllodes Zahlbr. 1936
- Arthothelium psyllodes var. precursum Zahlbr. 1936
- Arthothelium violascens (Flot.) Zahlbr. 1922

Genus: Arthrobotryum Ces. 1854

- Arthrobotryum melanoplaca Berk. & M.A. Curtis 1868 accepted as Spiropes melanoplaca (Berk. & M.A. Curtis) M.B. Ellis, (1968)

Genus: Arthrosporium Sacc. 1880

- Arthrosporium parasiticum G. Winter 1886 accepted as Atractilina parasitica (G. Winter) Deighton & Piroz., (1972)

== As ==
Genus: Ascobolus Pers. ex J.F. Gmel. 1792

- Ascobolus ciliatus Berk. [sic] possibly J.C. Schmidt 1817 accepted as Lasiobolus papillatus (Pers.) Sacc., (1884) or Ascobolus ciliatus var. ciliatus Berk. 1836
- Ascobolus ciliatus Schum.*
- Ascobolus furfuraceus Pers. 1794
- Ascobolus stercorarius (Bull.) J. Schröt. 1893 accepted as Ascobolus furfuraceus Pers., (1794)

Genus: Ascochyta Lib. 1830

- Ascochyta alkekengi C. Massal. 1900
- Ascochyta atropunctata G. Winter 1885
- Ascochyta calpurniae G. Winter 1885
- Ascochyta caricae Pat. 1891
- Ascochyta cherimoliae Thüm. 1879.
- Ascochyta citricola McAlpine 1899
- Ascochyta dianthi (Alb. & Schwein.) Berk. 1860 accepted as Septoria dianthi (Alb. & Schwein.) Desm., (1849)
- Ascochyta kentiae Maubl. 1903
- Ascochyta nicotianae Pass. 1881 accepted as Boeremia exigua (Desm.) Aveskamp, Gruyter & Verkley, (2010)
- Ascochyta papaveris Oudem. 1885, accepted as Diplodina papaveris (Oudem.) Lind, (1926)
- Ascochyta parasitica Fautrey 1891 accepted as Sirococcus conigenus (Pers.) P.F. Cannon & Minter, (1983)
- Ascochyta pisi Lib. 1830, accepted as Didymella pisi Chilvers, J.D. Rogers & Peever, (2009)

Genus: Ascophanus Boud. 1869

- Ascophanus durbanensis Van der Byl 1925 accepted as Iodophanus durbanensis (Van der Byl) Kimbr., Luck-Allen & Cain, (1969)
- Ascophanus granulatus (Bull.) Speg. 1878 accepted as Cheilymenia granulata (Bull.) J. Moravec, (1990)
- Ascophanus granuliformis (P. Crouan & H. Crouan) Boud. 1869 accepted as Coprotus granuliformis (P. Crouan & H. Crouan) Kimbr., (1967)
- Ascophanus sp.

Genus: Ascostratum Syd. & P. Syd. 1912

- Ascostratum insigne Syd. & P. Syd. 1912

Genus: Ascotricha Berk. 1838,

- Ascotricha chartarum Berk. 1838

Genus: Aseroe Labill. 1800

- Aseroe rubra Labill. 1800

Family: Ashbyaceae C.W. Dodge 1935

Genus: Ashbya Guillierm. 1928

- Ashbya gossypii (S.F. Ashby & W. Nowell) Guillierm. (1928), accepted as Eremothecium gossypii (S.F. Ashby & W. Nowell) Kurtzman, J. (1995)

Genus: Aspergillus P. Micheli 1729

- Aspergillus amstelodami (L. Mangin) Thom & Church 1926
- Aspergillus candidus Link 1809
- Aspergillus carbonarius (Bainier) Thom 1916
- Aspergillus eburneus Biourge. accepted as Aspergillus neoniveus Samson, S.W. Peterson, Frisvad & Varga, (2011)
- Aspergillus flavus Link 1809
- Aspergillus fumigatus Fresen. 1863
- Aspergillus glaucus (L.) Link 1809
- Aspergillus minutus Gilman & Abott [sic] probably E.V. Abbott 1927;
- Aspergillus niger Tiegh. 1867
- Aspergillus ochraceus (series)
- Aspergillus melleus Yukawa.
- Aspergillus parasiticus Speare
- Aspergillus repens (Corda) Sacc. (1882), valid on Species Fungorum accepted as Aspergillus reptans Samson & W. Gams, (1986) per Mycobank
- Aspergillus repens-glaucus (series) [sic] possibly G. Wilh. 1877
- Aspergillus sartoryi Syd. 1913
- Aspergillus sulphureus (Fresen.) Thom & Church 1926
- Aspergillus sydowi (Bainier & Sartory) Thom & Church 1926
- Aspergillus terreus Thom 1918
- Aspergillus versicolor (Vuill.) Tirab. 1908
- Aspergillus welwitschiae (Bres.) Henn. 1907
- Aspergillus sp.

Genus: Aspicilia A. Massal. 1852

- Aspicilia nubila (Stizenb.) Hue 1912

Genus: Asterella (may refer to Asterella Rostr. 1888, accepted as Venturia; Venturiaceae, Asterella (Sacc.) Sacc. 1891, accepted as Asterina; Asterinaceae, or Asterella Hara 1936, accepted as Astrosphaeriella; Pleosporales)

- Asterella infuscans (G. Winter) Sacc. 1891
- Asterella phaeostroma (Cooke) Sacc. 1891
- Asterella rehmii Henn. 1893 accepted as Placoasterella rehmii (Henn.) Theiss. & Syd., (1915)

Family: Asterinaceae Hansf. 1946

Genus: Asterina Lév. 1845

- Asterina africana (Van der Byl) Doidge 1942
- Asterina africana var. kiggelariae Doidge 1942 accepted as Asterina africana (Van der Byl) Doidge, (1942)
- Asterina aulica Syd. 1938
- Asterina balansae var. africana Theiss.*
- Asterina bosmanae Doidge 1942
- Asterina bottomleyae Doidge 1942
- Asterina capensis Kalchbr. & Cooke 1880 accepted as Meliola capensis (Kalchbr. & Cooke) Theiss., (1912)
- Asterina capparicola [as capparidicola] Doidge (1942)
- Asterina celtidicola Henn. 1905
- Asterina celtidicola var. microspora Doidge 1920 accepted as Asterina celtidicola Henn. 1905
- Asterina clausenicola Doidge 1920
- Asterina combreti Syd. & P. Syd. 1910
- Asterina combreti var. kutuensis v. Hohn*
- Asterina confluens Kalchbr. & Cooke 1880
- Asterina crotonicola Doidge 1922
- Asterina crotoniensis R.W. Ryan 1939
- Asterina delicata Doidge 1920
- Asterina diplocarpa Cooke 1882
- Asterina diplocarpa var. hibisci Doidge 1942 accepted as Asterina hibisci (Doidge) Hosag., (2004)
- Asterina dissiliens (Syd.) Doidge 1942 accepted as Prillieuxina dissiliens (Syd.) Arx, (1962)
- Asterina dissiliens var. senegalensis Doidge 1942 accepted as Prillieuxina dissiliens (Syd.) Arx, (1962)
- Asterina ditricha Kalchbr. & Cooke 1880
- Asterina elegans Doidge 1942
- Asterina erysiphoides Kalchbr. & Cooke 1880 accepted as Asterostomella erysiphoides (Kalchbr. & Cooke) Bat. & Cif., (1959)
- Asterina excoecariae Doidge 1920
- Asterina ferruginosa Doidge 1920
- Asterina fimbriata Kalchbr. & Cooke 1880
- Asterina fleuryae Doidge 1942
- Asterina gerbericola Doidge 1924
- Asterina gibbosa var. megathyria Doidge 1920, accepted as Asterolibertia megathyria (Doidge) Doidge, (1942)
- Asterina grewiae Cooke 1882
- Asterina grewiae var. zonata Doidge 1942 accepted as Asterina grewiae Cooke 1882
- Asterina hendersoni Doidge 1920
- Asterina inconspicua (Doidge) Doidge 1942 accepted as Prillieuxina inconspicua (Doidge) Arx, (1962)
- Asterina infuscans G. Winter 1885
- Asterina interrupta G. Winter 1884 accepted as Vizella interrupta (G. Winter) S. Hughes, (1953)
- Asterina knysnae Doidge 1942
- Asterina loranthicola Syd. & P. Syd. 1914
- Asterina macowaniana Kalchbr. & Cooke 1880
- Asterina myriadea Cooke 1882
- Asterina natalensis Doidge 1920
- Asterina natalitia Doidge 1942
- Asterina nodosa Doidge 1942
- Asterina oncinotidis Doidge 1942
- Asterina opaca Syd. & P. Syd. 1912
- Asterina oxyanthi Doidge 1942
- Asterina pavoniae Werderm. 1923
- Asterina peglerae Doidge 1920
- Asterina pemphidioides Cooke 1876
- Asterina peraffinis Speg. 1889
- Asterina phaeostroma Cooke 1882
- Asterina polythyria Doidge 1920
- Asterina punctiformis var. fimbriata (Kalchbr. & Cooke) Theiss
- Asterina radiofissilis (Sacc.) Theiss. 1912
- Asterina raripoda Doidge 1920 accepted as Maublancia raripoda (Doidge) Arx, (1962)
- Asterina reticulata Kalchbr. & Cooke 1880
- Asterina rhamnicola Doidge 1920 accepted as Schiffnerula rhamnicola (Doidge) S. Hughes, (1987)
- Asterina rinoreae Doidge 1942 accepted as Asteridiella rinoreae (Doidge) Hansf. (1961)
- Asterina robusta Doidge 1920
- Asterina saniculae Doidge 1942
- Asterina scolopiae Doidge 1922
- Asterina secamonicola Doidge 1927
- Asterina similis Cooke 1882
- Asterina solaris Kalchbr. & Cooke 1880 accepted as Asterodothis solaris (Kalchbr. & Cooke) Theiss., (1912)
- Asterina sphaerasca Thüm. 1875
- Asterina streptocarpi Doidge 1924
- Asterina stylospora Cooke 1882 accepted as Capnodiastrum stylosporum (Cooke) Petr., (1952)
- Asterina syzygii Doidge 1942
- Asterina tenuis G. Winter 1886
- Asterina tertia var. africana Doidge 1920 accepted as Asterina tertia Racib. 1913
- Asterina toruligena Cooke 1882
- Asterina trichiliae Doidge 1920
- Asterina trichocladi Doidge 1942 accepted as Maublancia trichocladii (Doidge) Arx, (1962)
- Asterina uncinata Doidge 1920
- Asterina undulata Doidge 1920
- Asterina vagans Speg. 1888
- Asterina vagans var. subreticulata Theiss*
- Asterina vanderbijlii Werderm. 1923 [as van der Bylii]
- Asterina vepridis Doidge 1942
- Asterina woodiana (Doidge) Doidge 1942
- Asterina woodii Doidge 1942
- Asterina xumenensis Doidge 1942
- Asterina zeyheri Doidge 1942

Genus: Asterinella Theiss. 1912

- Asterinella acokantherae Doidge 1920 accepted as Lembosina acokantherae (Doidge) Arx [as 'acocantherae'], (1962)
- Asterinella burchelliae Doidge 1920 accepted as Asterolibertia burchelliae (Doidge) Doidge, (1942)
- Asterinella contorta (Doidge) Hansf. 1946
- Asterinella dissiliens Syd. 1924 accepted as Prillieuxina dissiliens (Syd.) Arx, (1962)
- Asterinella dissiliens var. senegalensis Doidge*
- Asterinella inconspicua (Doidge) Hansf. 1948 accepted as Prillieuxina inconspicua (Doidge) Arx, (1962)
- Asterinella lembosioides Doidge 1920 accepted as Echidnodes lembosioides (Doidge) Doidge, (1942)
- Asterinella mimusopsis Doidge [as 'mimusopsidis'], (1922)
- Asterinella pterocelastri Doidge 1924 accepted as Prillieuxina pterocelastri (Doidge) R.W. Ryan, (1939)
- Asterinella tecleae Doidge 1942
- Asterinella woodiana Doidge 1920,

Genus Asterodothis Theiss. 1912

- Asterodothis solaris (Kalchbr. & Cooke) Theiss. 1912

Genus: Asterolibertia G. Arnaud 1918

- Asterolibertia burchelliae (Doidge) Doidge 1942
- Asterolibertia megathyria (Doidge) Doidge 1942
- Asterolibertia megathyria var. randiae Doidge 1942

Genus: Asteroma DC. 1815

- Asteroma pallidum Kalchbr. [sic]*
- Asteroma pullum Kalchbr. 1875

Genus: Asteromyxa Theiss. & Syd. 1918 accepted as Dimeriella Speg., (1908)

- Asteromyxa inconspicua Doidge 1924 accepted as Prillieuxina inconspicua (Doidge) Arx, (1962)

Genus: Asterostomella Speg. 1886

- Asterostomella eugeniicola Doidge [as 'eugenicola'], (1942)
- Asterostomella reticulata v.Hohn.*
- Asterostomella visci Doidge 1942

Genus: Asterostroma Massee 1889

- Asterostroma cervicolor (Berk. & M.A. Curtis) Massee 1889

Genus: Asterostromella Höhn. & Litsch. 1907 accepted as Vararia P. Karst., (1898)

- Asterostromella rumpiana P.H.B. Talbot 1948

Genus: Astrosporina J. Schröt. 1889 accepted as Inocybe (Fr.) Fr., (1863)

- Astrosporina maritima (P. Karst.) Rea 1922 accepted as Inocybe impexa (Lasch) Kuyper, (1986)

Family: Astrotheliaceae Zahlbr. 1898

== Au ==
Genus: Auerswaldia possibly Rabenh. 1857, accepted as Melanospora Ceratostomataceae, or Auerswaldia Sacc. 1883; Dothideaceae

- Auerswaldia disciformis G. Winter 1884 accepted as Auerswaldiella winteri Arx & E. Müll., (1954)
- Auerswaldia examinans (Berk.) Sacc. 1883 accepted as Bagnisiella examinans (Berk.) Arx & E. Müll., (1975)
- Auerswaldia scabies (Kalchbr. & Cooke) Sacc. 1883 accepted as Phyllachora scabies (Kalchbr. & Cooke) Cooke, (1885)

Family: Auriculariaceae Fr. 1838

Genus: Auricularia Bull. 1780

- Auricularia auricula-judae Seer. [sic] possibly (Bull.) Quél. 1886
- Auricularia delicata (Mont. ex Fr.) Henn. 1893
- Auricularia eminii Henn. 1893 [as Emini]
- Auricularia flava Lloyd 1922
- Auricularia fuscosuccinea (Mont.) Henn. 1893
- Auricularia lobata Sommerf. 1826 accepted as Auricularia mesenterica (Dicks.) Pers., (1822)
- Auricularia mesenterica Fr. [sic] possibly (Dicks.) Pers. 1822
- Auricularia mesenterica var. lobata Quel. [sic]*
- Auricularia nigra P.Henn. [sic] possibly (Sw.) Earle 1899 accepted as Auricularia nigricans (Sw.) Birkebak, Looney & Sánchez-García, (2013)
- Auricularia ornata Pers. 1827
- Auricularia polytricha (Mont.) Sacc. (1885), accepted as Auricularia nigricans (Sw.) Birkebak, Looney & Sánchez-García, (2013)
- Auricularia squamosa Pat. & Har. 1893

== See also ==
- List of bacteria of South Africa
- List of Oomycetes of South Africa
- List of slime moulds of South Africa
- List of fungi of South Africa
  - List of fungi of South Africa – A
  - List of fungi of South Africa – B
  - List of fungi of South Africa – C
  - List of fungi of South Africa – D
  - List of fungi of South Africa – E
  - List of fungi of South Africa – F
  - List of fungi of South Africa – G
  - List of fungi of South Africa – H
  - List of fungi of South Africa – I
  - List of fungi of South Africa – J
  - List of fungi of South Africa – K
  - List of fungi of South Africa – L
  - List of fungi of South Africa – M
  - List of fungi of South Africa – N
  - List of fungi of South Africa – O
  - List of fungi of South Africa – P
  - List of fungi of South Africa – Q
  - List of fungi of South Africa – R
  - List of fungi of South Africa – S
  - List of fungi of South Africa – T
  - List of fungi of South Africa – U
  - List of fungi of South Africa – V
  - List of fungi of South Africa – W
  - List of fungi of South Africa – X
  - List of fungi of South Africa – Y
  - List of fungi of South Africa – Z
