= Alternaria leaf spot =

Fungal plant disease

Alternaria leaf spot or Alternaria leaf blight are a group of fungal diseases in plants, that have a variety of hosts. The diseases infects common garden plants, such as cabbage, and are caused by several closely related species of fungi. Some of these fungal species target specific plants, while others have been known to target plant families. One commercially relevant plant genus that can be affected by Alternaria Leaf Spot is Brassica, as the cosmetic issues caused by symptomatic lesions can lead to rejection of crops by distributors and buyers. When certain crops such as cauliflower and broccoli are infected, the heads deteriorate and there is a complete loss of marketability. Secondary soft-rotting organisms can infect stored cabbage that has been affected by Alternaria Leaf Spot by entering through symptomatic lesions. Alternaria Leaf Spot diseases that affect Brassica species are caused by the pathogens Alternaria brassicae and Alternaria brassicicola.

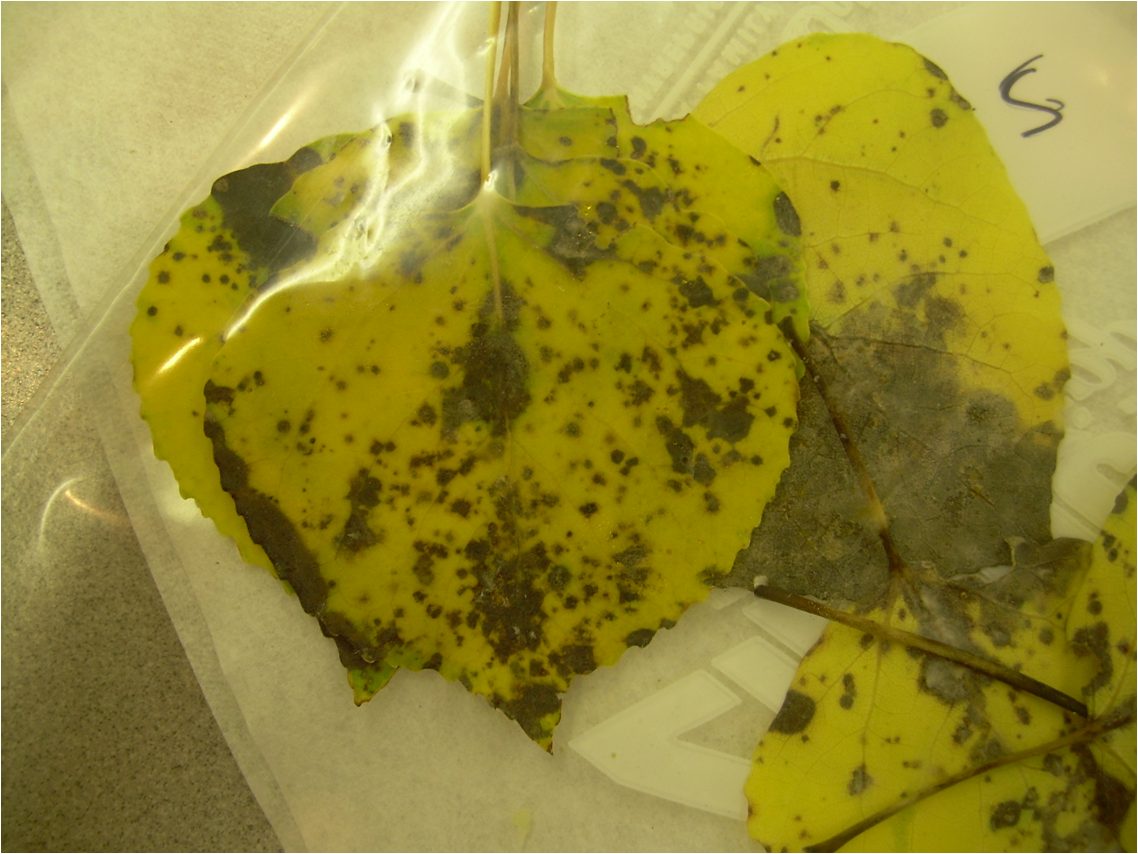
Alternaria leaf spot on quaking aspen leaves

== Hosts and symptoms ==
A. brassicae and A. brassicicola can infect plant species of the genus Brassica. Hosts include broccoli, cabbage, cauliflower, turnip, kale, rutabaga, Brussels sprout, and mustard. Specifically, plants that have longer periods of leaf wetness are more susceptible to development of the disease. Areas with higher rainfall that experience wet, mild seasons lead to the highest reports of disease incidence. Water promotes disease development as the pathogens only undergo germination and infection after more than nine hours of leaf wetness. A. brassicae and A. brassicicola cause very similar symptoms, with symptoms normally occurring on older leaves, as they are closer to the soil and more likely to be affected by rain splash, which spreads the pathogen. Necrotic lesions bordered by chlorotic halos develop on the leaf surface. These lesions are dark brown to black circular leaf spots with target-like, concentric rings. Shot holing may also occur when lesion centers dry and fall out, similar to the lesions observed in Early Blight caused by Alternaria solani. Symptoms do not usually significantly reduce yields, but they can cause cosmetic issues that reduce marketability of the crop. However, heavy infections of foliage can reduce plant vigor and can result in lower than expected yields.

== Disease cycle ==
A. brassicae and A. brassicicola produce asexual conidia via conidiophores. At optimum temperatures (20-30 C), the average time of sporulation is 13 hours. Conidia are dispersed via water and wind after sporulation. Once they come into contact with a leaf surface under optimal environmental conditions, germination can begin. Germination of conidia occurs most efficiently when temperatures are higher, with germination time increasing as temperature decreases. Germination occurs most quickly at temperatures between 21 and 28 C. The presence of moisture as water or a high relative humidity (at least 95%) is required for germination. After germination, the pathogen begins to infect the host via penetration of the leaf surface using an appressorium and infection peg. Leaf cells are infected, and the symptomatic lesions begin to appear, with conidia-producing conidiophores being produced from mature lesions. Further dispersal of conidia by water or wind occurs from these new conidiophores. This dispersal can be local from one leaf to an adjacent leaf, or it can be long distance from plant to plant.'The spores can be blown in the wind for distances up to 1.1 miles.A. brassicae and A. brassicicola survive in the form of microsclerotia and chlamydospores which appear after infected leaves have partially decayed. Both of these survival structures develop best at low temperature (3 C) and they have been found to be resistant to desiccation and freezing. Conidiophores eventually develop from the microsclerotia and chlamydospores, allowing for the production of conidia again and the cycle to repeat.

== Management ==
A. brassicae and A. brassicicola can be chemically controlled by applying fungicides as foliar sprays. These fungicides include iprodione and chlorothalonil. It is recommended to practice crop rotation with non-cruciferous crops. This creates periods of time when no active pathogen is present in the area due to lack of a host. If there are no pathogens present, they cannot produce microsclerotia and chlamydospores that would eventually be input into the surrounding area via plant debris, reducing chances of future infection. It is also recommended to irrigate in the morning when leaves can dry quickly, and to orient rows according to the wind. Morning irrigation promotes shorter periods of leaf wetness, disrupting the pathogens’ germination and infection. Orientation of rows disrupts dispersal of conidia via wind by reducing contact. Application of straw mulch can reduce disease incidence by acting as a barrier against soil-borne inoculum, disrupting dispersal of conidia from conidiophores developed from microsclerotia and chlamydospores. Maintaining control of cruciferous weeds is another important management practice, as this removes potential hosts for the pathogen that can aid in the spread of the disease.
