= A. solaris =

A. solaris may refer to:

- Asterodothis solaris, a fungus species
- Attus solaris, a synonym for Attulus helveolus, a jumping spider species found in Europe

== See also ==
- Solaris (disambiguation)
