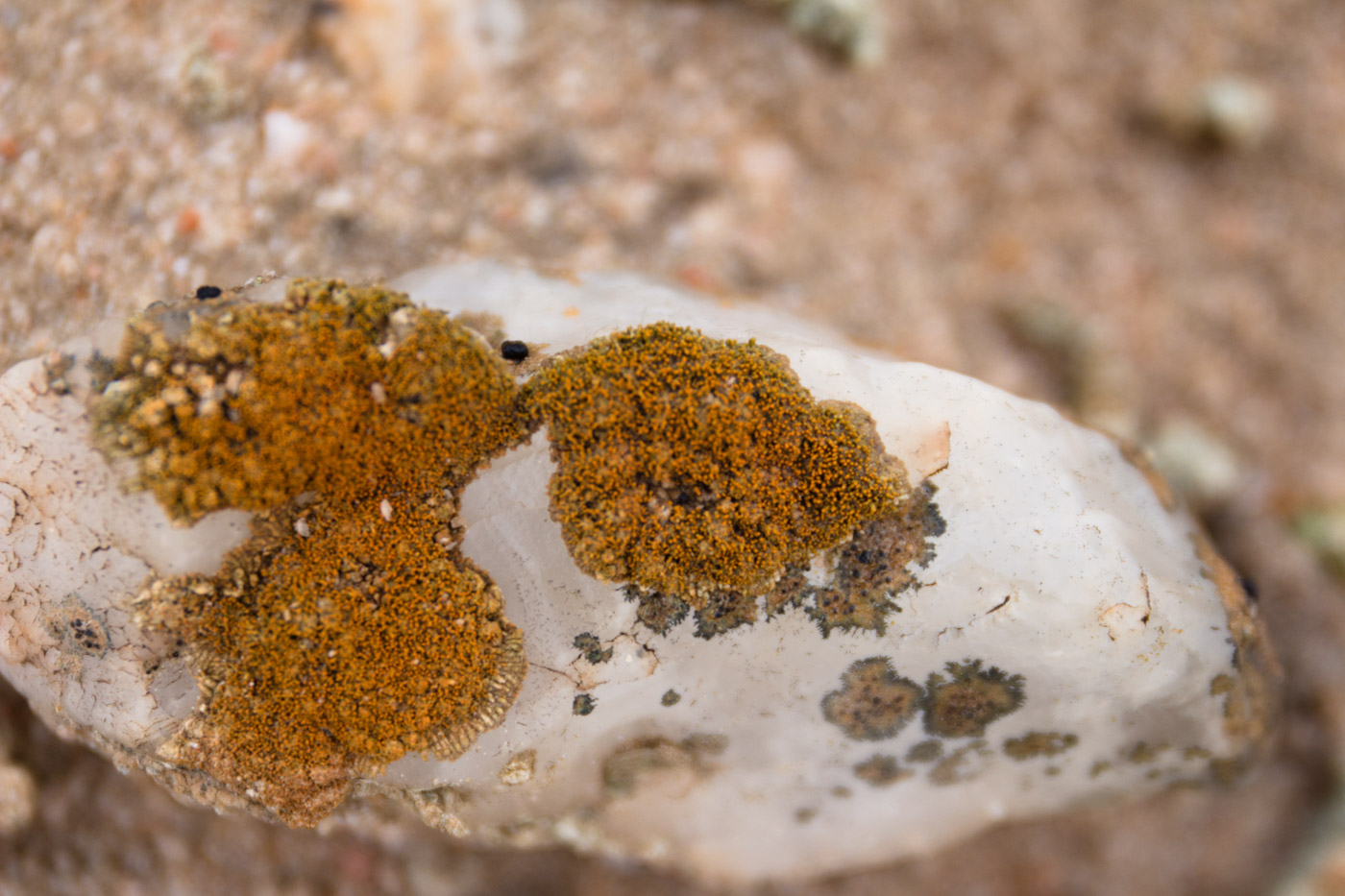

Scientific classification
- Domain: Eukaryota
- Kingdom: Fungi
- Division: Ascomycota
- Class: Lecanoromycetes
- Order: Teloschistales
- Family: Teloschistaceae
- Genus: Stellarangia
- Species: S. namibensis

Binomial name
- Stellarangia namibensis (Kärnefelt) Frödén, Arup & Søchting (2013)

Synonyms
- Caloplaca namibensis Kärnefelt (1988)

= Stellarangia namibensis =

Species of lichen

Stellarangia namibensis is a species of saxicolous (rock-dwelling), crustose lichen in the family Teloschistaceae. It was first formally described in 1988 by Ingvar Kärnefelt, as a member of the genus Caloplaca. The type specimen was collected by the author from the gravel flats east of Cape Cross, in Omaruru, Namibia. The same species was collected from Angola by Austrian botanist Friedrich Welwitsch in 1859. The taxon was transferred to the genus Stellarangia in 2013 by Ulrik Søchting and colleagues, as part of a molecular phylogenetics-based restructuring of the Teloschistaceae.

Stellarangia namibensis is one of the most common lichen species in Namibia's fog desert region; another is its close relative, S. elegantissima. The known range of Stellarangia namibensis was considerably expanded when it was reported to occur along the coast of the Atlantic Sahara in Morocco.
