= Acremoniella atra =

Scientific classification
- Domain: Eukaryota
- Kingdom: Fungi
- Division: Ascomycota
- Class: Sordariomycetes
- Order: Hypocreales
- Genus: Acremoniella
- Species: A. atra

Binomial name
- Acremoniella atra Corda) Sacc.

Species of fungus

Acremoniella atra (A. atra) is a species of fungus with unknown family.

A. atra has been reported in the rhizospehere of multiple plants, particularly wheat. It has cosmopolitan distribution.
