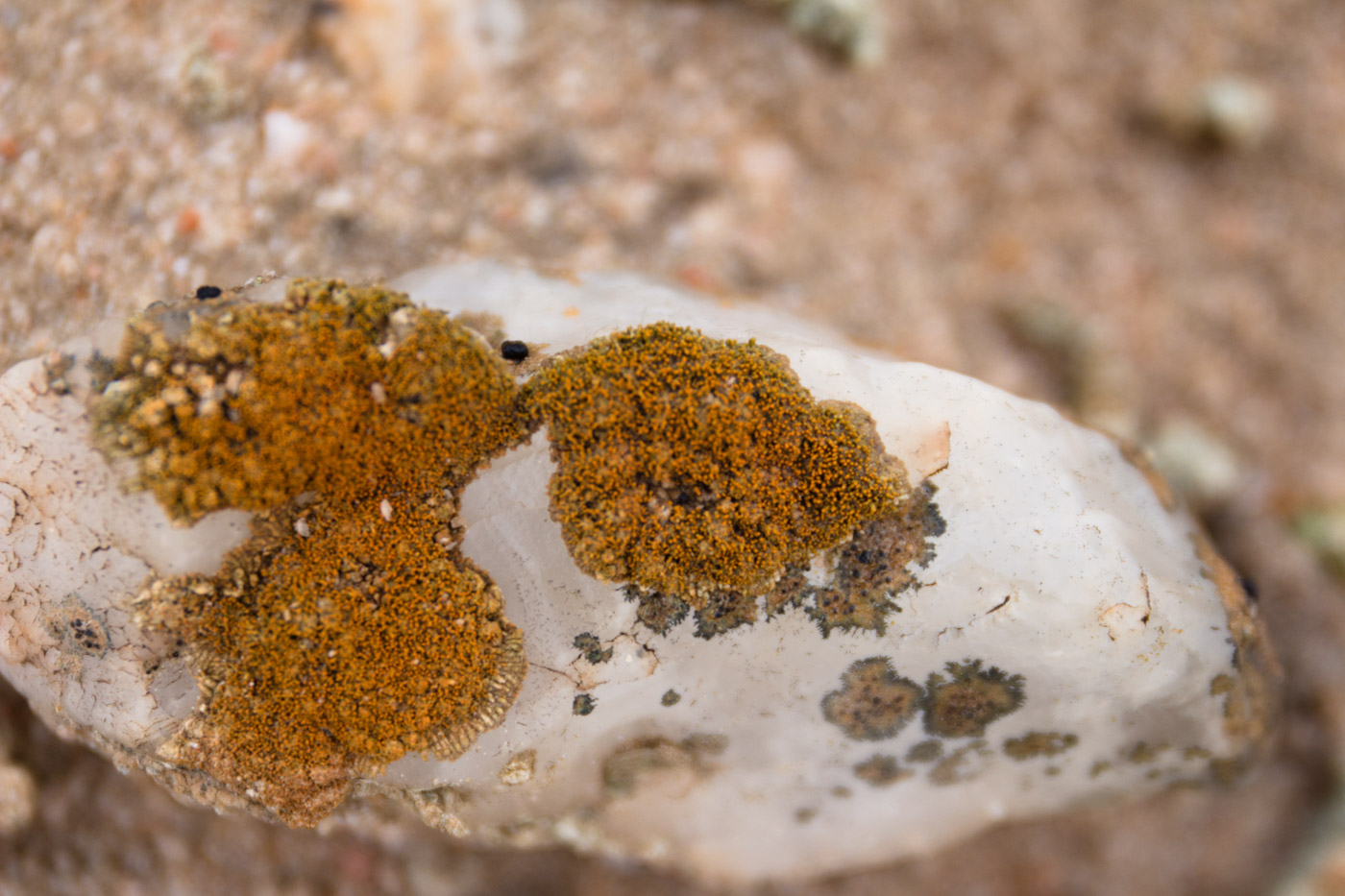
- Stellarangia namibensis

Scientific classification
- Domain: Eukaryota
- Kingdom: Fungi
- Division: Ascomycota
- Class: Lecanoromycetes
- Order: Teloschistales
- Family: Teloschistaceae
- Genus: Stellarangia; Frödén, Arup & Søchting (2013)

Type species
- Stellarangia elegantissima (Nyl.) Frödén, Arup & Søchting (2013)

Species
- S. elegantissima S. namibensis S. testudinea

= Stellarangia =

Genus of lichens

Stellarangia is a genus of lichen-forming fungi in the family Teloschistaceae. It has three species of saxicolous (rock-dwelling), crustose lichens. Species of Stellarangia are found in dry, desert areas in Namibia and South Africa.

== Taxonomy ==
The genus was circumscribed in 2013 by Patrik Frödén, Ulf Arup, and Ulrik Søchting, with S. elegantissima assigned as the type species. It is in the subfamily Teloschistoideae of the Teloschistaceae. The genus name means "yellow star".

== Description ==
Stellarangia is characterized by a crustose thallus structure, often accompanied by well-developed marginal lobes. An exception to this may be observed in S. testudinea where the lobes may sometimes be absent. These lichens have a complex cortex structure, characterised as prosoplectenchymatous, along with an additional epicortex layer. S. testudinea specimens frequently feature isidia, specialised outgrowths that aid in vegetative reproduction.

Apothecia (reproductive structures) are a rarity in Stellarangia. When present, they have an orange colour and are classified as zeorine in form. The spores formed in the apothecia are polarilocular, with short septa. Pycnidia, a type of asexual fruiting body, have not been observed to occur in this genus.

From a chemical perspective, Stellarangia falls into the A3 chemosyndrome, indicating a distinct set of secondary metabolites associated with the lichen.

== Habitat and distribution ==
Species of Stellarangia are found in dry, desert areas in Namibia and South Africa. Stellarangia is part of lichen communities found in unique habitats beneath rocks (hypolithic) in the Namib Desert, which provide special microclimatic conditions conducive to their growth. They display an inverted morphology as an adaptive mechanism to high irradiance and low water availability in desert soils. Furthermore, an undescribed lichen-forming fungal species belonging to Stellarangia has been discovered in these habitats.

== Species ==
- Stellarangia elegantissima (Nyl.) Frödén, Arup & Søchting (2013)
- Stellarangia namibensis (Kärnefelt) Frödén, Arup & Søchting (2013)
- Stellarangia testudinea (V.Wirth & Kärnefelt) Frödén, Arup & Søchting (2013)
