= Alternaria macrospora =

Scientific classification
- Domain: Eukaryota
- Kingdom: Fungi
- Division: Ascomycota
- Class: Dothideomycetes
- Order: Pleosporales
- Family: Pleosporaceae
- Genus: Alternaria
- Species: A. macrospora

Binomial name
- Alternaria macrospora Zimm.

Synonyms
- Macrosporium macrosporum (Zimm.) Nishikado & Oshima, Nogaku-kenkyu 36: 391 (1944); Alternaria longipedicellata Snowden, Report Dept. of Agric. Uganda: 31 (1927)

Species of fungus

Alternaria macrospora is a plant pathogen.
