= Acremoniella =

Scientific classification
- Domain: Eukaryota
- Kingdom: Fungi
- Division: Ascomycota
- Class: Sordariomycetes
- Order: Hypocreales
- Genus: Acremoniella; Sacc.

Genus of fungi

Acremoniella is a genus of fungus with unknown family.

The genus was first described by Pier Andrea Saccardo in 1886.

The genus has cosmopolitan distribution.

Species:

- Acremoniella alascensis R.Sprague
- Acremoniella atra (Corda) Sacc.
