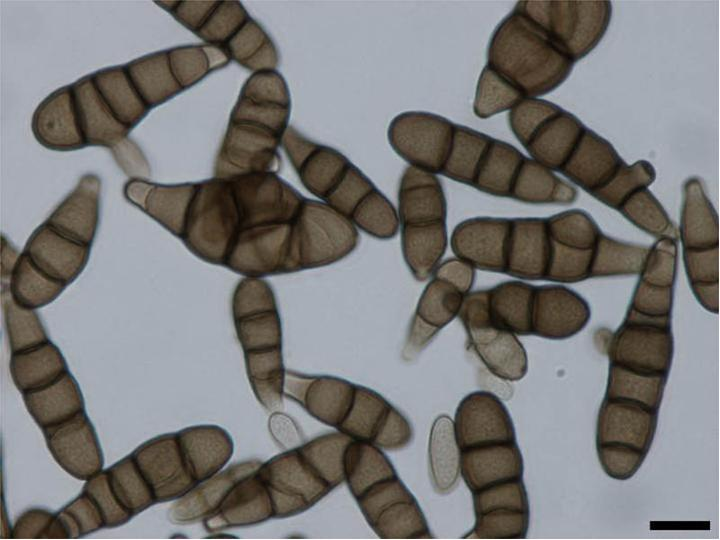

Scientific classification
- Kingdom: Fungi
- Division: Ascomycota
- Class: Dothideomycetes
- Order: Pleosporales
- Family: Pleosporaceae
- Genus: Alternaria
- Species: A. brassicicola

Binomial name
- Alternaria brassicicola (Schwein.) Wiltshire, (1947)

Synonyms
- Alternaria brassicae f. microspora Alternaria brassicae var. minor Alternaria circinans Berk. & M.A. Curtis, (1924); Alternaria oleracea Milbraith, (1922); Helminthosporium brassicae Henn, (1902); Helminthosporium brassicicola Schwein, (1832); Macrosporium cheiranthi var. circinans Berk. & M.A. Curtis, (1875); Macrosporium circinans Macrosporium commune var. circinans Polydesmus exitiosus f. alternarioides J.G. Kühn, (1855); Polydesmus exitiosus f. luxuriosum Sporidesmium exitiosum f. alternarioides Sporidesmium exitiosum f. luxuriosum Sporidesmium septorioides

= Alternaria brassicicola =

Species of fungus

Alternaria brassicicola is a fungal necrotrophic plant pathogen that causes black spot disease on a wide range of hosts, particularly in the genus of Brassica, including a number of economically important crops such as cabbage, Chinese cabbage, cauliflower, oilseeds, broccoli and canola. Although mainly known as a significant plant pathogen, it also contributes to various respiratory allergic conditions such as asthma and rhinoconjunctivitis. Despite the presence of mating genes, no sexual reproductive stage has been reported for this fungus. In terms of geography, it is most likely to be found in tropical and sub-tropical regions, but also in places with high rain and humidity such as Poland. It has also been found in Taiwan and Israel. Its main mode of propagation is vegetative. The resulting conidia reside in the soil, air and water. These spores are extremely resilient and can overwinter on crop debris and overwintering herbaceous plants.

== Growth and morphology ==
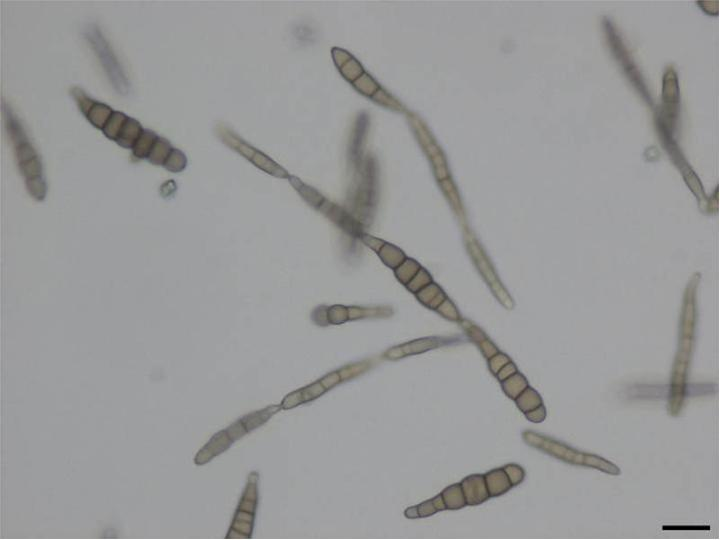
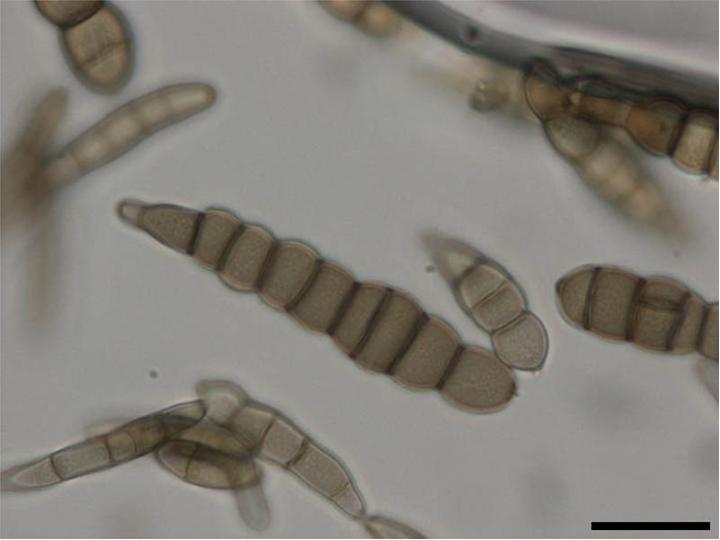
Alternaria brassicicola chain-like conidia (left and right)
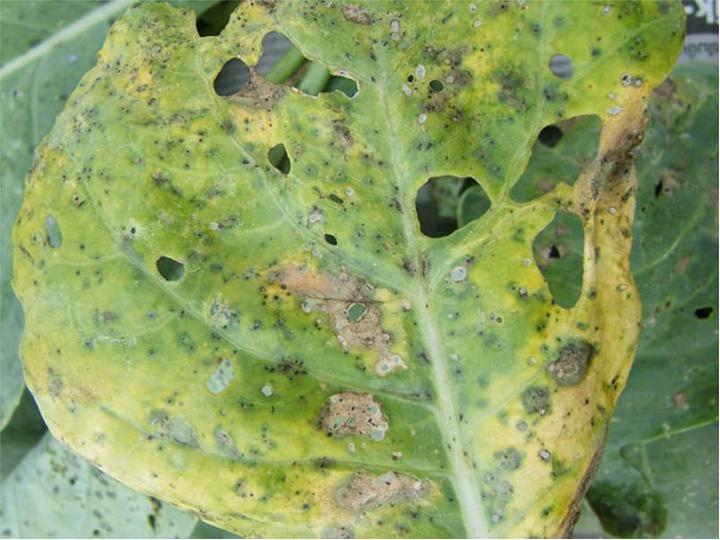
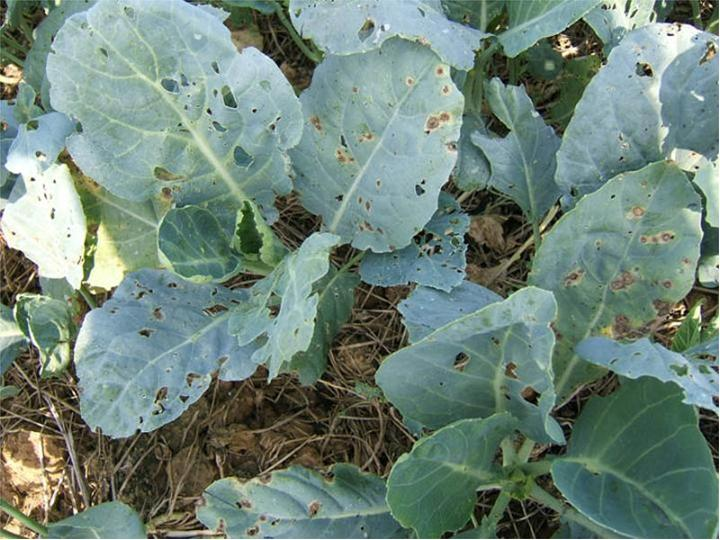
Legions of A. brassicicola on Chinese Kale

The conidia of A. brassicicola are abundant in the outdoor environment from the months of May to late October in the northern hemisphere, peaking in June and again in October. The conidia are dark brown and smooth-walled, up to 60 x 14μm. The conidia are cylindrical to oblong in shape and are muriform and produced in chains of 8-10 spores. They are firmly attached to conidiophores that are olive-brown, septate, and growing to an upper range of 100-200 μm, although this overall length may vary. Conidia are borne in continuous, chain-like structure, but branching at the base has also been observed. Although conidia can be spread by rain, the most common means of spread is through the air. The fungus grows on epidermal leaf wax of plants, particularly those in the Brassicaceae, and prefers an environment with high humidity and temperature range of 20–30 °C (68–86 °F). Macroscopically, the mycelium exhibits a range of colour: unpigmented when young, to olive-grey, grey-black at maturity. Colonies of A. brassicicola tend to be dark brown or black in colour.

== Research history ==
Historically, much of the early research concerning the fungus was based on plant defense mechanisms. However, once its genome was sequenced, efforts shifted to identifying the genes involved in host-parasite interaction. One of the pioneers for genetic research into Alternaria brassicicola was the Lawrence group at Virginia Bioinformatics Institute and the Genome Center at Washington University. The most common media used for A. brassicicola growth are PDA (potato dextrose agar) and V8 juice-agar. In vitro and under optimal conditions, colonies grow rapidly and appear dark green or white-grey. Spontaneous sporulation occurs at 25 °C in darkness on PDA medium.

=== Growth cycle ===
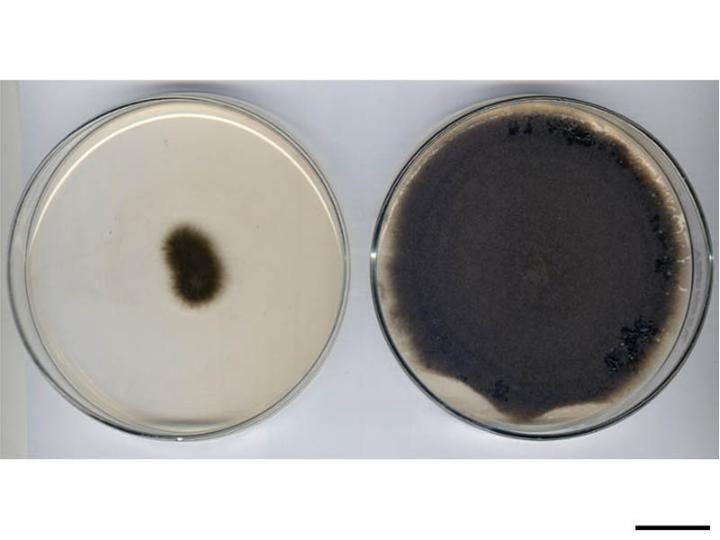
Colonies of A. brassicicola on Potato Dextrose Agar after 3 d (l) and 7 d (r).

Hours after inoculation:

- 2h: Conidia swells
- 3h: Germ tube formation observed at the apical or middle cells of conidia
- 8h: Vesicle of dissolved contents moves from conidial cell to germ tube
- 20h: Infection of the host cell
- 48h: Mycelial network develops on the surface
- 72h: Many chains of conidia can be seen

== Pathogenesis and infection ==
There are three main sources of infection: nearby infected seeds, spores from plant debris in the topsoil and Brassica weeds, and spores moved by wind and air from farther away. Infected leaves can spread their spores up to a diameter of 1800m. There are also three major entry points to the host cell: epidermal penetration, stomatal penetration and penetration through an insect. Contact with the host cell triggers the release of various cell wall degrading enzymes which allow the fungus to attach itself to the plant and begin degradation. The suggested mode of attack is through host-specific toxins, primarily AB toxins, that induce cell death by apoptosis. This results in what look like dents and lesions in the host plant. These are brown, concentric circles with a yellow tinge at the circumference, usually about 0.5-2.5 cm in diameter. Necrosis can generally be observed within 48 hours of infection. The spores can reside on the external seed coat of infected seeds, but the mycelium can also penetrate under the seed coat, where it has the ability to remain viable for several years. Occasionally, it can even penetrate the embryo tissue. The primary mode of transmission is through contaminated seed. Also, the infection is not limited to specific areas of the host plant; it can spread all over and even cause damping off of the seedlings at a relatively early stage. It also affects the host species at various developmental stages. As mentioned above, seedlings exhibit dark stem lesions followed by damping off. Velvety, black spots, resembling soot, can be observed on older plants. Pathogenesis is affected by factors such as: temperature, humidity, pH, reactive oxidation species, host defense molecules.

=== Genes ===
Out of the 10,688 predicted genes from the A. brassicicola genome, 139 encode small secretion proteins that may be involved in pathogenesis, 76 encode lipases and 249 encode glycosyl hydrolases that are important for polysaccharide digestion, potentially damaging host cells. In contrast, mutations in genes such as AbHog1, AbNPS2, and AbSlt2 affect cell wall integrity and make the fungus more susceptible to host defenses. Currently, research is being done to identify the gene(s) responsible for encoding a transcription factor, Bdtf1, important for the detoxification of host metabolites.

=== Biochemistry ===
The most common toxin studied for A. brassicicola is the AB toxin, said to be connected to the virulence, pathogenicity and host range for the fungus. It is most likely produced during conidial germination and probably linked to the ability of the fungus to infect and colonize Brassica leaves However, recent studies have explored new potential metabolites. For example, this fungus also produces histone deacetylase inhibitors, but these do not have a significant impact on lesion size. Some studies show only a 10% reduction in virulence. Furthermore, alternariol and tenuazonic acid seem to affect mitochondrial-mediated apoptosis pathways and protein synthesis respectively (in the host cell), but again, not to a significant degree. Some cytokines have been linked with the discolouration associated with A. brassicicola infection. Cell wall degrading enzymes like lipases and cutinases are also linked to its pathogenicity, but more evidence of their efficacy is required. One important transcription factor is AbPf2. It regulates 6 of the 139 genes encoding small secretion proteins and may have a role in pathogenesis, specifically cellulose digestion.

=== Treatments ===
In order to protect their crops, many individuals pre-treat their seeds with fungicides. The most widespread active ingredients in these fungicides are Iprodione and Strobilurins. In 1995, it was reported that Iprodione most likely acts by mutating two histidine residues in the target site of enzymes. Ultimately, it inhibits germ tube growth. However, the ubiquitous use of fungicides has resulted in the fungus growing increasingly resistant. Thus, different, non-chemical approaches have been explored. People have tried to develop resistant Brassicaceae crops through breeding. However, this has proved challenging due to the difficulty of transferring genes from wild-type to cultivated strains, resulting in genetic bottlenecks. It is further complicated by the probability that resistance seems to be a polygenic trait. There are also some Brassica plants that have developed resistance to the pathogen naturally. High phenolase activity, high leaf sugar, and thicker wax layers reduce water-borne spore germination. It has been shown that the presence of camalexin in the host plant helps it to disrupt pathogen development. For example, an Arabidopsis mutant in the pad-3 gene that does not produce camalexin is more susceptible to infection. Varying levels show differing levels of resistance. Another suggestion put forth is crop debris management. The aim is to minimize exposure of the crop plants to spores present in the soil by using crop rotation and weed control.

Biological approaches have also been studied. One approach has been to use antagonistic fungi such as Aureobasidium pullulans & Epicoccum nigrum to subdue the effect of A. brassicicola. The plants C. fenestratum and Piper betle also show potent fungicidal activity towards A. brassicicola both in vitro and under greenhouse conditions. These levels are comparable to Iprodione. The active compound, berberine, affects cell wall integrity and ergosterol biosynthesis. Ethanol extracts from the dried roots of Solanum nigrum (black nightshade), traditionally used as herbal remedies in places ranging from the Far East to India and Mexico, show promising anti-fungal activity as well. They seem to suppress conidial germination, possibly by interfering with the AB toxin.

== Economic impact ==
As mentioned previously, Alternaria brassicicola causes severe black spot diseases in a number of ecologically important crops. Often, it occurs in conjunction with Alternaria brassicae. However, it is the more dominant invasive species. These infections lead to a significant loss in viable seeds and produce. The resulting lesions greatly reduce available photosynthetic area, leading to wilt and plant death. Crops like infected cabbages do not last long during storage or transportation. In some cases, yield reductions can be as high as 20-50%. The lack of ability to use fungicides makes it challenging to sustain organic crops in a cost-effective way.
