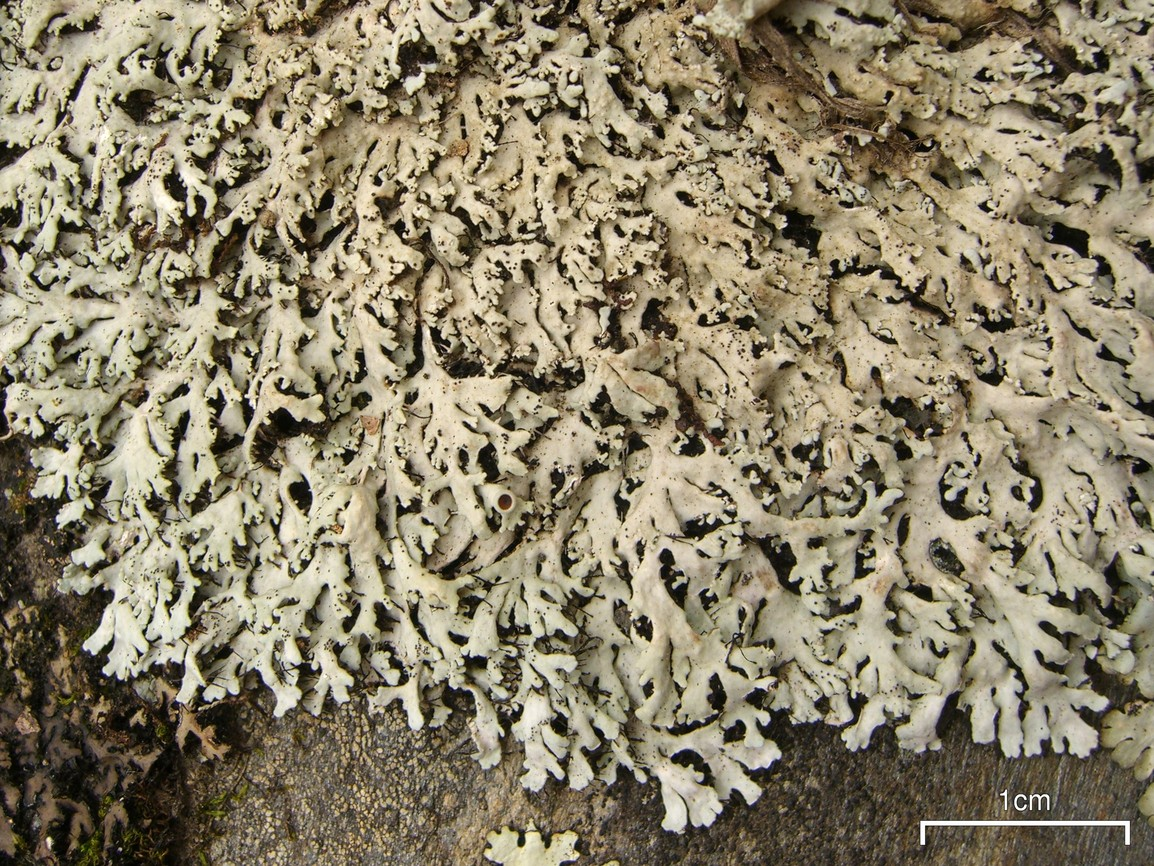

Scientific classification
- Kingdom: Fungi
- Division: Ascomycota
- Class: Lecanoromycetes
- Order: Caliciales
- Family: Physciaceae
- Genus: Polyblastidium
- Species: P. hypoleucum

Binomial name
- Polyblastidium hypoleucum (Ach.) Kalb (2015)

Synonyms
- List: Parmelia speciosa f. hypoleuca Ach. (1814); Anaptychia hypoleuca (Ach.) A.Massal. (1860); Physcia speciosa var. hypoleuca (Ach.) Nyl. (1860); Heterodermia hypoleuca (Ach.) Trevis. (1868); Physcia hypoleuca (Ach.) Tuck. (1882); Physcia speciosa subsp. hypoleuca (Ach.) Tuck. (1882); Anaptychia speciosa var. hypoleuca (Ach.) Müll.Arg. (1891); Pseudophyscia speciosa var. hypoleuca (Ach.) Müll.Arg. (1893); Pseudophyscia hypoleuca (Ach.) Hue (1899); Xanthoria speciosa var. hypoleuca (Ach.) Horw. (1912); Parmelia speciosa var. hypoleuca (Ach.) Zahlbr. (1931); Parmelia hypoleuca Muhl. ex Zahlbr. (1931); Heterodermia hypoleuca var. divergens Trass (2001)

= Polyblastidium hypoleucum =

Species of lichen-forming fungus

Polyblastidium hypoleucum, the cupped fringe lichen, is a widely distributed species of corticolous (bark-dwelling), foliose lichen in the family Physciaceae.

== Taxonomy ==
The species was first formally described by the Swedish lichenologist Erik Acharius in 1814, who considered it a form of what was then known as Parmelia speciosa. Vittore Benedetto Antonio Trevisan de Saint-Léon reclassified it in the genus Heterodermia in 1868. It was transferred to the newly circumscribed genus Polyblastidium in 2015 by Klaus Kalb.

== Description ==
Polyblastidium hypoleuca is a foliose (leaf-like) lichen with a grey to blue-grey upper surface. The thallus lacks vegetative propagules such as soredia and isidia, and is instead composed of long, flat lobes that spread outward and often develop short secondary lobes in the central parts of the thallus. The internal medulla is white. The underside is pale and lacks a distinct cortex, while the rhizines are dark, squarrose (branching like a bottlebrush), and concentrated along the lobe margins. Apothecia (fruiting bodies) are common, borne on the upper surface (laminal), and frequently have margins that break up into small squamules.

Chemically, the species contains atranorin, zeorin, a terpenoid compound and probably leucotylin. In standard spot tests the cortex reacts K+ (yellow) and P+ (yellowish), but is C−, KC− and UV−; the medulla is K−, C−, KC−, P− and UV−.

In North America, it is commonly known as the "cupped fringe lichen".

== Habitat and distribution ==
Polyblastidium hypoleuca is a widely distributed lichen, having been recorded from all continents except for Antarctica. It is most often found in humid habitats growing on deciduous trees.
