= Aspergillus reptans =

Scientific classification
- Domain: Eukaryota
- Kingdom: Fungi
- Division: Ascomycota
- Class: Eurotiomycetes
- Order: Eurotiales
- Family: Aspergillaceae
- Genus: Aspergillus
- Species: A. reptans

Binomial name
- Aspergillus reptans (Corda) Sacc.

Species of fungus

Aspergillus reptans is a species of fungus belonging to the family Aspergillaceae.

It is native to Eurasia and Northern America.

Synonyms:

- Aspergillus repens (Corda) Sacc
