= Asterodothis =

Scientific classification
- Kingdom: Fungi
- Division: Ascomycota
- Class: Dothideomycetes
- Order: Asterinales
- Family: Asterinaceae
- Genus: Asterodothis; Theiss.

Type species
- Asterodothis solaris

Genus of fungi

Asterodothis is a genus of fungi in the Asterinaceae family. The relationship of this taxon to other taxa within the class is unknown (incertae sedis), and it has not yet been placed with certainty into any order. This is a monotypic genus, containing the single species Asterodothis solaris.
