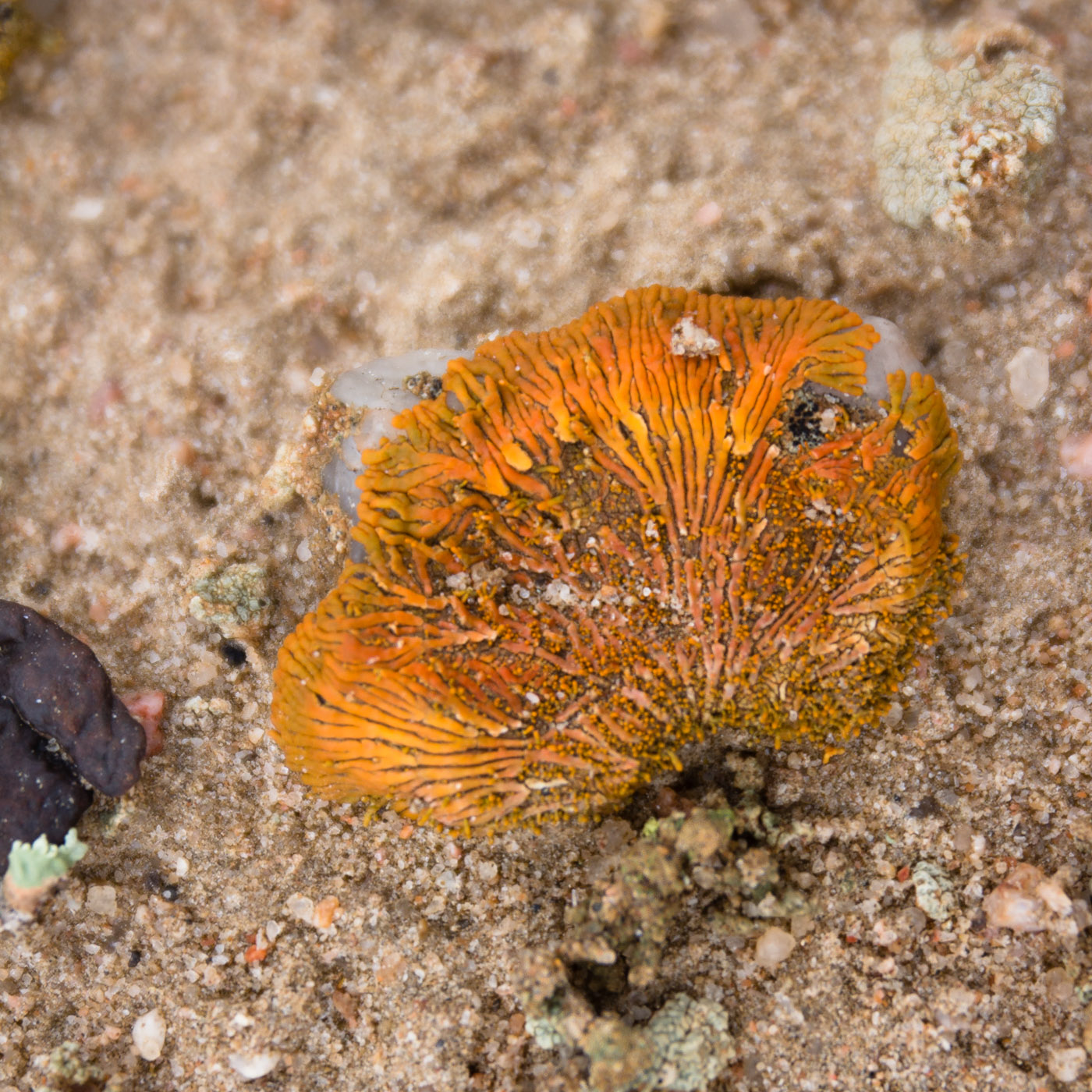

Scientific classification
- Domain: Eukaryota
- Kingdom: Fungi
- Division: Ascomycota
- Class: Lecanoromycetes
- Order: Teloschistales
- Family: Teloschistaceae
- Genus: Stellarangia
- Species: S. elegantissima

Binomial name
- Stellarangia elegantissima (Nyl.) Frödén, Arup & Søchting (2013)

Synonyms
- Lecanora elegantissima Nyl. (1868); Amphiloma elegantissimum (Nyl.) Müll.Arg. (1888); Placodium elegantissimum (Nyl.) Vain. (1901); Caloplaca elegantissima (Nyl.) Zahlbr. (1931); Kuettlingeria elegantissima (Nyl.) C.W.Dodge (1971)

= Stellarangia elegantissima =

Species of lichen

Stellarangia elegantissima, the showy Namib firedot, is a species of saxicolous (rock-dwelling), crustose lichen in the family Teloschistaceae. It occurs in the deserts of south-western Africa. Having been shuffled to various genera in its taxonomic history, it was finally placed in genus Stellarangia in 2013 by Patrik Frödén and colleagues, following a molecular phylogenetics-based restructuring of the family Teloschistaceae.

== Taxonomy ==
Stellarangia elegantissima, originally formally described as Lecanora elegantissima by Finnish lichenologist William Nylander in 1868, has undergone significant typification revisions. The initial description was based on composite material, likely involving both Stellarangia elegantissima and a closely related species. The morphological characteristics described by Nylander aligned with those observed in Stellarangia elegantissima. However, the fragment labeled as 'vestigio' in the Nylander herbarium in Helsinki, initially thought to represent S. elegantissima, was later identified as S. namibensis. This misidentification arose due to the removal of isidia during storage, leaving distinct marks on the specimen.

Nylander's original citation of Friedrich Welwitsch's collections from Mossamedes (now Namibia) indicated a possibility that both C. elegantissima and C. namibensis were collected, as they often co-occur in similar habitats. Subsequent investigation of Welwitsch's collections at the Natural History Museum, London (herbarium code BM) and at the herbarium of the University of Lisbon, Portugal (LISU) revealed materials that matched the new species described as Caloplaca elegantissima, characterised by narrow lobes and small isidia. This finding suggested that Nylander's description likely included a mixed collection predominantly of C. namibensis but also contained elements of C. elegantissima.

Since the original type material for Caloplaca elegantissima conflicted with Nylander's description and the material at BM and LISU did not correspond to C. elegantissima, a neotype was necessary. The provisions of Article 69 of the International Code of Nomenclature for algae, fungi, and plants, which would call for the rejection of a name if widely used for a taxon not including its type, were deemed inapplicable. Consequently, a neotype was selected from the more recent collections of C. elegantissima. This decision was guided by the need to maintain consistency with the species' widely accepted characteristics and its historical use.

In their 2024 popular work on lichens, Robert Lücking and Toby Spribille gave the species a vernacular name reflecting its striking appearance: the "showy Namib firedot".

== Description ==
Stellarangia elegantissima has a radiate thallus, typically varying in size from 2 to 5 cm (0.8 to 2 in) across. The smallest forms appear on pebbles, while the largest are found on sizeable rocks. The lichen is characterised by its composition of cartilaginous, convex lobes, each measuring 0.5 to 1.8 mm in width and 5 to 30 mm in length. These lobes feature a distinctive effiguration at the margins and are weakly dichotomously branched. Over time, they tend to become raised and unattached, particularly in the central areas where they consist of shorter, sparse lobes, each 1 to 3 mm long. Occasionally, short accessory lobules develop along the margins of the lobes. The lichen's colour ranges from scarlet and orange-red to pale orange, with larger specimens typically showing lighter pigmentation at the margins.

The epinecral zone is about 20 to 45 μm thick, consisting of prosoplectenchymatous, thick-walled hyphae. The cortex, hyaline in nature, is 150 to 230 μm thick and made of strongly gelatinised hyphae, with the uppermost 15 to 20 μm layer being orange-yellowish pigmented. The photobiont within Stellarangia elegantissima is green and spherical, about 5.5 to 12 μm in diameter, and occurs in clusters 35 to 75 μm in size, mainly embedded in a layer of strongly gelatinised hyphae. The medulla, measuring 200 to 250 μm in thickness, is made of more lax hyphae, often containing numerous small granules that are fluorescent under interference contrast microscopy.

Apothecia are scattered, primarily in the central portions of the thallus but can also develop on the peripheral lobes. These apothecia are sessile, becoming slightly raised as they mature, and range from 0.5 to 1.5 mm across. The discs are initially cupular or plane, later turning strongly convex, and are usually darker or of the same colour as the lobes. The excipulum is up to 100 μm thick, while the hymenium measures 75 to 100 μm, covered by a thin epihymenial layer. The asci are 45 to 50 by 9 to 12 μm. Ascospores are broadly ellipsoidal, 10 to 12 by 8 to 9 μm, with a septum approximately 2 μm thick. Paraphyses measure 75 to 100 by 0.75 μm. The hypothecium extends up to 300 μm in depth and is hyaline, with the photobiont concentrated in clusters below it. Conidiomata have not been observed in this species.

Several lichen products have been identified in Stellarangia elegantissima: parietin, teloschistin, xanthorin, erythroglaucin, fallacinal, parietinic acid, and traces of emodin.
