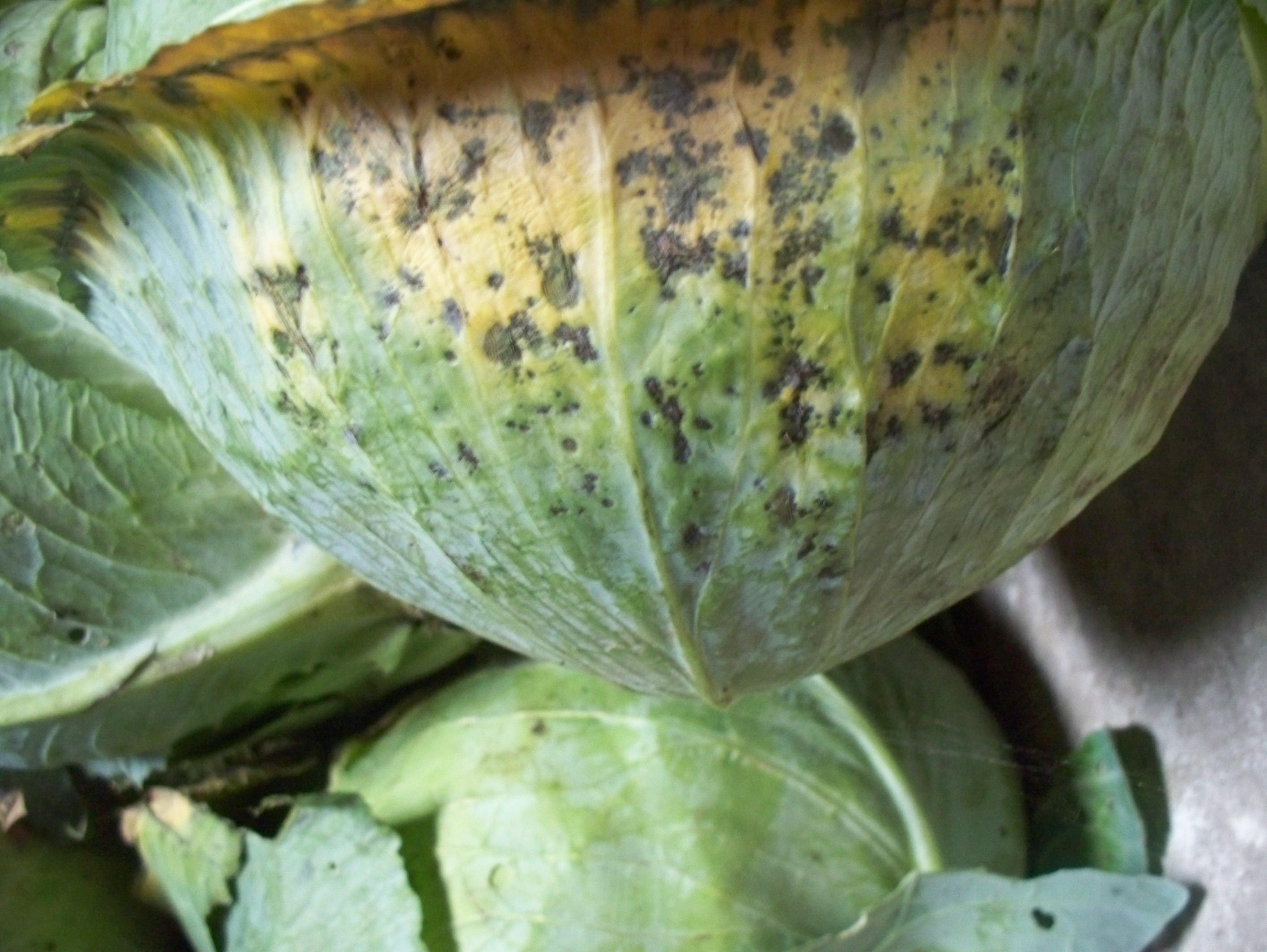
- Alternaria brassicae symptoms on cabbage

Scientific classification
- Kingdom: Fungi
- Division: Ascomycota
- Class: Dothideomycetes
- Order: Pleosporales
- Family: Pleosporaceae
- Genus: Alternaria
- Species: A. brassicae

Binomial name
- Alternaria brassicae (Berk.) Sacc., (1880)

Synonyms
- List: Alternaria alliariae-officinalis; Săvul. & Sandu, Hedwigia 73: 130 (1933); Alternaria brassicae f. acanthi; Politis, Phragmat. Akad. Athen. 4: 40 (1935); Alternaria brassicae f. citri; Penz., Fung. Agrum.: 92, tab. 1206 (1882); Alternaria brassicae f. phaseoli; Brunaud, Bull. Soc. Sci. Nat. Ouest 4: 38 (1894); Alternaria brassicae f. tritici; Brunaud, Bull. Soc. Sci. Nat. Ouest 4: 38 (1894); Alternaria brassicae var. dianthi; F. Zimmerman, Ochr. Rost. 4(1): 9 (1924); Alternaria brassicae var. exitiosa; (J.G. Kühn) Ferraris, Fl. ital. crypt., Fungi 1(8): 521 (1912); Alternaria brassicae var. microspora; J.A. Elliott, Danish species of Alternaria & Stemphylium: 129 (1945); Alternaria brassicae var. macrospora; Sacc., Syll. fung. (Abellini) 4: 546 (1886); Alternaria brassicae var. putrefaciens; Preissecker, Fachl. Mitteil. Österr. Tabakregie 16: 14 (1916); Alternaria brassicae var. solani; Preissecker, Fachl. Mitteil. Österr. Tabakregie 16: 14 (1916); Alternaria exitiosa; (J.G. Kühn) Jørst., Meld. Stat. Plantepat. Inst. Oslo 50: 94 (1945); Alternaria herculea; (Ellis & G. Martin) J.A. Elliott, Am. J. Bot. 4: 472 (1917); Alternaria macrospora; (Sacc.) Mussat, in Saccardo, Syll. fung. (Abellini) 15: 43 (1901); Alternaria macrospora; (Sacc.) Sawada, Rep. Dept Agric., Govern. Res. Inst. Formosa, Spec. Bull. Agric. Exp. Station Formosa 51: 123 (1931); Alternaria macrospora var. sterculiae; M.D. Mehrotra, Indian Forester 111(10): 823 (1985); Alternaria saccardoi; Sawada, Special Publication College of Agriculture, National Taiwan University 8: 208 (1959); Cercospora lepidii; Peck, Ann. Rep. N.Y. St. Mus. nat. Hist. 35: 140 (1884); Cercospora moldavica; Săvul. & Bontea, Bul. Fac. Agron., Bucuresti 4: 3 [repr.] (1946); Dicaeoma brassicae; (Mont.) Kuntze, Revis. gen. pl. (Leipzig) 3(3): 468 (1898); Macrosporium brassicae; Berk., in Smith, Engl. Fl., Fungi (Edn 2) (London) 5(2): 339 (1836); Macrosporium brassicae f. solani; Fautrey & Brunaud, Revue mycol., Toulouse 16(no. 62): 76 (1894); Macrosporium brassicae f. resedacearum; Roum., Revue mycol., Toulouse 16(no. 64): 8 (1894); Macrosporium brassicae var. macrosporum; A.G. Eliasson, Bih. K. svenska VetenskAkad. Handl., Afd. 3 22(no. 12): 18 (1897); Macrosporium herculeum; Ellis & G. Martin, Am. Nat. 16(12): 1003 (1882); Macrosporium macrosporum; (A.G. Eliasson) Sawada, Agr. Res. Rev., Cairo. Pl. Path. 47(5): 163 (1969); Polydesmus exitiosus; (J.G. Kühn) J.G. Kühn, Ann. Sper. agr., N.S.: 165 (1858); Puccinia brassicae; Mont., Annls Sci. Nat., Bot., sér. 2 6: 30 (1836); Rhopalidium brassicae; Mont. & Fr., in Montagne, Annls Sci. Nat., Bot., sér. 2 6: 30 (1836); Sporidesmium brassicae; Massee, Bull. Misc. Inf., Kew: 153 (1901); Sporidesmium exitiosum; J.G. Kühn, Hedwigia 1: 91 (1855); Sporidesmium exitiosum var. solani; Schenk, Voy. Alpes maritimes 8: 282 (1875); Sporidesmium onnii; P. Karst., Meddn Soc. Fauna Flora fenn. 18: 67 (1891)

= Alternaria brassicae =

Species of fungus

Alternaria brassicae is a plant pathogen able to infect most Brassica species including important crops such as broccoli, cabbage and oil seed rape. It causes damping off if infection occurs in younger plants and less severe leaf spot symptoms on infections of older plants.
