= List of fungi of South Africa – M =

This is an alphabetical list of the fungal taxa as recorded from South Africa. Currently accepted names have been appended.

== Ma ==
Genus: Macowania

- Macowania agaricina Berk.

Genus: Macowaniella

- Macowaniella congesta Doidge
- Macowaniella myrsinicola Doidge

Genus: Macowanites Kalchbr. (1882), accepted as Russula Pers. (1796)

- Macowanites agarieinum Kalchbr.

Genus: Macrodiplodia

- Macrodiplodia corticale Kalchbr. & Cooke

Genus: Macrophoma

- Macrophoma agapanthi Trav.
- Macrophoma aloes Scalia.
- Macrophoma artemisiae Berl. & Vogl
- Macrophoma cattleyicola P.Henn.
- Macrophoma clematidis Togn.
- Macrophoma curvispora Peek. accepted as Neofabraea malicorticis H.S.Jacks., (1913)
- Macrophoma dryopteris Verw. & du Pless.
- Macrophoma falconieri P.Henn.
- Macrophoma oleae Berl. & Vogl.
- Macrophoma palnuirum Berl. & Vogl.
- Macrophoma pinea Petrak & Syd.
- Macrophoma sp.

Genus: Macrophomina

- Macrophomina limbalis Syd.
- Macrophomina phaseoli (Maubl.) S.F. Ashby (1927) accepted as Macrophomina phaseolina (Tassi) Goid. (1947)

Genus: Macrosporium

- Macrosporium camelliae Cooke & Mass.
- Macrosporium carotae Ellis & Langl., (1890), accepted as Alternaria dauci (J.G.Kühn) J.W.Groves & Skolko, (1944)
- Macrosporium citri McAlp.
- Macrosporium cladosporioides Desm.
- Macrosporium commune Rabenh., (1870), accepted as Pleospora herbarum (Pers.) Rabenh. (1857)
- Macrosporium cucumerinum Ellis & Everh., (1895) accepted as Alternaria cucumerina, (Ellis & Everh.) J.A.Elliott, (1917)
- Macrosporium eucalypti P.Henn.
- Macrosporium iridis Cooke & Ell.
- Macrosporium lanceolatum Mass.
- Macrosporium longipes Ell. & Everh.
- Macrosporium maydis Cooke & Ell.
- Macrosporium nigricantium Atk.
- Macrosporium nobile Vize.
- Macrosporium oleae Berl. & Vogl.
- Macrosporium phaseoli Fautr.
- Macrosporium porri Ell.
- Macrosporium punctatum Kalchbr. & Cooke
- Macrosporium sarcinula Berk.(1838), accepted as Pleospora herbarum (Pers.) Rabenh. (1857)
- Macrosporium solani Ell. & Mart. accepted as Alternaria solani Sorauer, (1896)
- Macrosporium tabacinum Ell. & Mart.
- Macrosporium tomato Cooke
- Macrosporium vitis Sorok.
- Macrosporium sp.

Genus: Madurella

- Madurella sp.

Genus: Malacaria

- Malacaria meliolieola Syd.

Genus: Malassezia

- Malassezia furfur Baillon.

Genus: Marasmius

- Marasmius calopus Fr.
- Marasmius candidus Fr.
- Marasmius delectans Morgan.
- Marasmius epiphyllus Fr.
- Marasmius filaris Kalchbr. & MacOwan.
- Marasmius haematocephalus Mont. ex Fr.
- Marasmius hariolorum Quel.
- Marasmius helvolus Berk.
- Marasmius oreadoides Pass.
- Marasmius petalinus Berk. & Curt.
- Marasmius rotula Fr.
- Marasmius saccharinu Fr.
- Marasmius scorodonius (Fr.) Fr., 1826 accepted as Mycetinis scorodonius (Fr.) A.W.Wilson & Desjardin, 2005
- Marasmius siccus Fr.
- Marasmius splachnoides Fr.
- Marasmius tener Berk. & Curt.
- Marasmius togoensis P.Henn.
- Marasmius thwaitesii Berk. & Br.
- Marasmius torquescens Quel.
- Marasmius ustorum Berk.
- Marasmius sp.

Genus: Maronea (Lichen)

- Maronea constans Hepp.
- Maronea crassilabra H.Magn.
- Maronea horizoides Wain.

Genus: Marssonina

- Marssonia castagnei Sacc.
- Marssonina fragariae (Lib.) Kleb., (1918) accepted as Diplocarpon earlianum (Ellis & Everh.) F.A.Wolf [as 'earliana'], (1924)
- Marssonina juglandis (Lib.) Magnus, (1906) accepted as Ophiognomonia leptostyla (Fr.) Sogonov, Stud. Mycol. 62: 62 (2008)
- Marssonina populi Magn.
- Marssonina sp.

Genus: Massecella

- Massecella flueggeae Syd. (sic)

== Me ==
Genus: Medusula

- Medusula disjectans Nyl.

Genus: Megalonectria

- Megalonectria nigrescens Sacc.
- Megalonectria pseudotrichia (Schwein.) Speg., (1881). accepted as Nectria pseudotrichia (Schwein.) Berk. & M.A. Curtis, (1853)

Genus: Megalospora

- Megalospora lutea Flotow.
- Megalospora stellenboschiana Zahlbr.
- Megalospora versicolor Zahlbr.

Genus: Megatrichophyton

- Megatrichophyton roseum Doidge

Family: Melampsoraceae (Rusts)

Genus: Melampsora

- Melampsora aecidioides Schroet.
- Melampsora helioscopiae Wint.
- Melampsora hyperici Schroet.
- Melampsora hypericorum Wint. var. australis Doidge
- Melampsora junodii Doidge
- Melampsora lini Lev.
- Melampsora mixta Schroet.
- Melampsora puccinioides Wint.
- Melampsora ricini Pass.
- Melampsora stratosa Cooke
- Melampsora tremulae Tul.
- Melampsora vitellinae Thuem.

Genus: Melampsorella

- Melampsorella ricini de Toni

Genus: Melampydium

- Melampydium metabolum Müll.Arg. subsp. africanum Zahlbr.

Genus: Melanaspicilia

- Melanaspicilia aethalea Wain.
- Melanaspicilia epichlora Vain.

Genus: Melanconiaceae Melanconiaceae

Genus: Melanconiales Melanconiales

Genus: Melanconium

- Melanconium fourcroyae Syd.
- Melanconium sacchari Massee, (1896), accepted as Phaeocytostroma sacchari (Ellis & Everh.) B. Sutton, (1964)

Genus: Melanogaster

- Melanogaster ambiguus Tul.
- Melanogaster owanianum Kalchbr.

Genus: Melanops

- Melanops perseae Petrak.

Genus: Melanopsamma

- Melanopsamma parasitica Sacc.

Genus: Melanopsichium

- Melanopsichium austro-americanum G.Beck

Genus: Melanospora

- Melanospora parasitica (Tul.) Tul. & C.Tul. (1865)accepted as Syspastospora parasitica (Tul.) P.F.Cannon & D.Hawksw. (1982)

Genus: Melanotheca

- Melanotheca oculea Stizenb.

Genus: Melasmia

- Melasmia confluens v.Hohn.
- Melasmia parinarii P.Henn.

Genus: Melaspilea (Lichens and lichenocolous)

- Melaspilea gemella Nyl.

Genus: Melastiza

- Melastiza charteri Boud.

Genus: Meliola

- Meliola acanthacearum Hansf.
- Meliola acridocarpi Doidge
- Meliola allophyli Doidge
- Meliola amphitricha Fr.
- Meliola apodytis v.d.Byl
- Meliola arcuata Doidge
- Meliola argentina Speg.
- Meliola atalayae Doidge
- Meliola atra Doidge
- Meliola azimae Doidge
- Meliola behniae Syd.
- Meliola bifida Cooke
- Meliola bosciae Doidge
- Meliola braehyodonta Syd.
- Meliola buxicola Doidge
- Meliola campylotricha Syd.
- Meliola capensis Theiss.
- Meliola capnodioides Thuem.
- Meliola carissae Doidge
- Meliola celtidicola v.d.Byl
- Meliola choristylidis Doidge
- Meliola cladophila Syd.
- Meliola chidotricha Lev.
- Meliola clavieulata Doidge
- Meliola cluytiae v.d.Byl.
- Meliola cnestidis Doidge
- Meliola comata Doidge
- Meliola conferta Doidge
- Meliola cryptocaryae Doidge
- Meliola cylindripoda Doidge
- Meliola dactylipoda Syd.
- Meliola ditricha Doidge
- Meliola doidgeae Syd.
- Meliola draeaenicola Pat. & Har.
- Meliola dummeri Hansf. var. brachyodonta Hansf.
- Meliola evansii Doidge
- Meliola excoecariae Doidge
- Meliola falcata Syd.
- Meliola furcillata Doidge
- Meliola ganglifera Kalchbr.
- Meliola gemellipoda Doidge
- Meliola geniculata Syd. & Butler var. macrospora Doidge
- Meliola glabra Berk. & Curt.
- Meliola gloriosa Doidge
- Meliola goniomae Doidge
- Meliola heudeloti Gaill.
- Meliola hippocrateae Doidge
- Meliola impatientis Doidge
- Meliola indigoferae Syd.
- Meliola inermis Kalchbr. & Cooke.
- Meliola jasminicola P. Henn.
- Meliola kentaniensis Doidge
- Meliola knowltoniae Doidge
- Meliola knysnae Doidge
- Meliola leptidea Syd.
- Meliola littoralis Syd.
- Meliola loxostylidis Doidge
- Meliola macowaniana Thuem.
- Meliola malacotricha Speg.
- Meliola manca Ell. & Mart.
- Meliola merrillii Syd.
- Meliola microspora var. africana Doidge
- Meliola microthecia Thuem.
- Meliola natalensis Doidge
- Meliola natalensis var. conferta Doidge
- Meliola natalensis var. lara Doidge
- Meliola ochnae Doidge
- Meliola oleicola Doidge
- Meliola oleicola var. jasmini Doidge
- Meliola oliniae Kalchbr.
- Meliola oncinotidis Doidge
- Meliola osyridis Doidge
- Meliola palmieola Wint.
- Meliola panici Earle.
- Meliola peddieicola Hansf.
- Meliola peglerae Doidge
- Meliola peltata Doidge
- Meliola perpusilla Syd. var. congoensis Beeli.
- Meliola petiolaris Doidge
- Meliola podocarpi Doidge
- Meliola polytrieha Kalchbr. & Cooke
- Meliola popowiae Doidge
- Meliola psilostomae Thuem.
- Meliola psychotriae Earle.
- Meliola ptaeroxyli Doidge
- Meliola puiggarii Speg.
- Meliola quinquespora Thuem.
- Meliola rhoina Doidge
- Meliola rhois P.Henn.
- Meliola rhois var. tenuis Doidge
- Meliola rigida Doidge
- Meliola sapindacearum Speg.
- Meliola scabra Doidge
- Meliola sclerochitoni Kalchbr.
- Meliola scolopiae Doidge
- Meliola sinuosa Doidge
- Meliola speciosa Doidge
- Meliola strophanthi Doidge
- Meliola thuemeniana Stev.
- Meliola toddaliae Doidge
- Meliola torta Doidge
- Meliola transvaalensis Doidge
- Meliola varia Doidge
- Meliola woodiana Sacc.
- Meliola xumenensis Doidge
- Meliola zehneriae v.d.Byl.
- Meliola sp. var. M. capnodioides Thuem.
- Meliola sp.

Family: Meliolaceae

Genus: Meliolaster

- Meliolaster mackenzii Doidge

Genus: Meliolina

- Meliolina arborescens Syd.
- Meliolina cladotricha Syd.
- Meliolina irenicolum Stevens.

Genus: Melogramma

- Melogramma eucalypti Kalchbr. & Cooke

Family: Melogrammataceae

Genus: Memnoniella

- Memnoniella echinata Gall.

Genus: Menispora

- Menispora cylindrica Kalchbr. & Cooke

Merulioidea

Genus: Merulius

- Merulius alneus (L.) J.F.Gmel. (1792), accepted as Schizophyllum commune Fr. (1815)
- Merulius corium Fr.
- Merulius gelatinosus Lloyd
- Merulius himantoides Fr.
- Merulius lacrymans Fr.
- Merulius pinastri Burt.
- Merulius rufus Pers. ex Fr.
- Merulius serpens Tode ex Fr.
- Merulius squalidus Fr.
- Merulius tremellosus Schrad. (1794), accepted as Phlebia tremellosa (Schrad.) Nakasone & Burds. (1984)

Genus: Metarrhizium

- Metarrhizium anisopliae Sorokin

Genus: Metasphaeria

- Metasphaeria brachiata Sacc.
- Metasphaeria caffra Petrak.
- Metasphaeria cumana Sacc.
- Metasphaeria metuloidea Sacc.

== Mi ==
Genus: Microcallis

- Microcallis nuxiae Hansf.
- Microcallis oleae Hansf.

Genus: Microcyclus

- Microcyclus kentaniensis Doidge
- Microcyclus osyridis (Cooke) Sacc. (1904), accepted as Microcyclus amphimelaenus (Mont.) Arx [as amphimelaena], in Müller & von Arx,(1962)
- Microcyclus tassianus (Sacc.) Syd. & P. Syd. (1904), accepted as Microcyclus amphimelaenus (Mont.) Arx [as amphimelaena], in Müller & von Arx,(1962)

Genus: Microdiplodia

- Microdiplodia rikatliensis Petrak.

Genus: Micropeltis

- Micropeltis maratliae P.Henn.
- Micropeltis stigma Cooke
- Micropeltis trichomanis P.Henn.

Genus: Microphiale

- Microphiale lutea Zahlbr.

Genus: Microsphaera

- Microsphaera alni (DC. ex Wallr.) G. Winter, (1884), accepted as Microsphaera penicillata (Wallr.) Lév., (1851)
- Microsphaera polonica Siemaszko.

Genus: Microsporon

- Microsporon furfur Robin.

Genus: Microsporum

- Microsporum audouinii Gruby.

Genus: Microstroma

- Microstroma albizziae Syd.
- Microstroma album Sacc.
- Microstroma quercinum Niessl.
- Microstroma quercinum f. roboris Thuem.

Genus: Microthelia

- Microthelia confluens Müll.Arg.
- Microthelia macrocarpoides Zahlbr.
- Microthelia micula Korb.
- Microthelia uniserialis Zahlbr.

Fanily: Microthyriaceae

Family: Microthyriae

Order: Microthyriales

Genus: Microthyriella

- Microthyriella transvaalensis Doidge

Genus: Microthyrium

- Microthyrium annuliforme Syd.
- Microthyrium maculicolum Doidge
- Microthyrium ranulisporum Doidge

Genus: Milesina

- Milesina dieteliana P.Magn.
- Milesina nervisequa Syd.

== Mo ==
Genus: Mollisia

- Mollisia aquosa Phill.
- Mollisia cinerea Karst.
- Mollisia subgilva Kalchbr. & Cooke

Genus: Monascus

- Monascus ruber van Tiegh.

Genus: Monilia accepted as Monilinia

- Monilia balcanica Castellani & Chalmers.
- Monilia bethaliensis Pijper
- Monilia fimicola Cost. & Matr.
- Monilia krusei Castellani & Chalmers
- Monilia pseudolondinensis Castellani & Chalmers
- Monilia pseudotropicalis Castellani & Chalmers
- Monilia rugosa Castellani & Chalmers
- Monilia sitophila Sace.
- Monilia zeylanica Castellani & Chalmers
- Monilia sp.

Genus: Monochaetia

- Monochaetia camelliae Miles.
- Monochaetia cydoniae Pole Evans & Doidge

Genus: Monoicomyces

- Monoicomyces zealandicus Thaxt.

Genus: Montagnella

- Montagnella asperata Syd.
- Montagnella maxima Mass.
- Montagnella peglerae Pole Evans

Family: Montagnellaceae

Genus: Montagnites

- Montagnites candollei Fr.

Genus: Morphella

- Morphella conica Pers.
- Morphella esculenta Pers.

Genus: Morenoella

- Morenoella oxyanthae Doidge
- Morenoella phillipsii Doidge

Genus: Morenoina

- Morenoina africana Doidge
- Morenoina dracaenae Doidge

Family:Mortierellaceae

== Mu ==
Family:Mucedinaceae

Genus: Mucor

- Mucor clavatus Linn.
- Mucor exitiosus Mass.
- Mucor hiemalis Wehm.
- Mucor mucedo Linn.
- Mucor racemosus Pres.
- Mucor rouxii Calm.
- Mucor stercorius Link.

Family: Mucoraceae

Family: Mucorales

Genus: Mucronella

- Mucronella aggregata Fr.

Genus: Mutinus

- Mutinus bambusinus Ed.Fisch.
- Mutinus curtisii Ed.Fisch.
- Mutinus simplex Lloyd.

== My ==
Mycelia sterilia

Genus: Mycena

- Mycena acicula Quel.
- Mycena alcalina Quel.
- Mycena actiniceps Sacc.
- Mycena arguta Sacc.
- Mycena capillaris Quel.
- Mycena elavicularis Gill.
- Mycena corticola Quel.
- Mycena debilis Quel.
- Mycena dilatata Gill.
- Mycena dregeana Sacc.
- Mycena galericulata S.F.Gray
- Mycena heliscus Sacc.
- Mycena hiemalis Quel.
- Mycena macrorrhiza Sacc.
- Mycena rhodiophylla Sacc.
- Mycena sciola Sacc.
- Mycena tenerrima (Fr.) Quél. (1874),accepted as Mycena adscendens (Lasch) Maas Geest. (1981)
- Mycena tintinnabula Quel.
- Mycena vitrea Quel.
- Mycena vulgaris Quel.
- Mycena sp.

Genus: Mycenastrum

- Mycenastrum corium (Guers.) Desv. (1842),
- Mycenastrum lejospermum Mont.
- Mycenastrum phaeotrichum Berk.

Genus: Mycobilimbia (Lichens)

- Mycobilimbia aeervata Vouaux.
- Mycobilimbia quatemella Vouaux.

Genus: Mycoderma

- Mycoderma pararugosum Dodge

Genus: Mycogone

- Mycogone aurantiaca da Cam.
- Mycogone sp.

Genus: Mycolangloisia

- Mycolangloisia nitida Hansf.

Genus: Mycoleptodon Pat. (1897), accepted as Steccherinum Gray (1821)

- Mycoleptodon ochraeeum Pat.

Family:Mycoporaceae

Genus: Mycoporellum

- Mycoporellum lahmii Müll.Arg.

Genus: Mycoporum

- Mycoporum lahmii Stizenb.
- Mycoporum pycnocarpum Nyl.

Genus: Mycosphaerella

- Mycosphaerella agapanthi Lindau.
- Mycosphaerella aloes Syd.
- Mycosphaerella areola Ehrlich & Wolf.
- Mycosphaerella brassicaecola Lindau.
- Mycosphaerella byliana Syd.
- Mycosphaerella citrullina (C.O. Sm.) Grossenb., (1909), accepted as Didymella bryoniae (Fuckel) Rehm, (1881)
- Mycosphaerella dichrostachydis v.d.Byl
- Mycosphaerella fragariae (Tul.) Lindau, 1897,
- Mycosphaerella gibelliana Pass.
- Mycosphaerella gossypina Atk.
- Mycosphaerella loranthi Syd.
- Mycosphaerella maculiformis (Pers.) J. Schröt., (1894), accepted as Mycosphaerella punctiformis (Pers.) Starbäck, (1889)
- Mycosphaerella moelleriana Lindau.
- Mycosphaerella moricola Linn.
- Mycosphaerella nemesiae Dipp.
- Mycosphaerella pinodes Stone. (sic), possibly (Berk. & A. Bloxam) Vestergr., (1912)accepted as Didymella pinodes (Berk. & A. Bloxam) Petr., (1924)
- Mycosphaerella plectranthi Doidge
- Mycosphaerella rubi Roark
- Mycosphaerella schoenoprasi Schroet. (sic) possibly Rabenh., (1894) [1897], accepted as Davidiella tassiana (De Not.) Crous & U. Braun, (2003)
- Mycosphaerella sentina (Fr.) J. Schröt., (1894), accepted as Mycosphaerella pyri (Auersw.) Boerema, (1970)
- Mycosphaerella theae Shaw

Family: Mycosphaerellaceae

Genus: Mycotoruloides

- Mycotoruloides triades Langeron & Talice.

Family: Myriangiaceae

Order:Myriangiales

Genus: Myriangium

- Myriangium montagnei Berk.

Genus: Myriostoma

- Myriostoma coliformis Corda.

Genus: Myrothecium

- Myrothecium verrucaria Alb. & Schw.

Genus: Mystrosporium

- Mystrosporium alliorum Berk.
- Mystrosporium aterrimum Berk. & Curt.
- Mystrosporium polytrichum Cooke
- Mystrosporium velutinum Kalchbr. & Cooke

Genus: Myxosporium

- Myxosporium corticola Edgert.

== See also ==
- List of bacteria of South Africa
- List of Oomycetes of South Africa
- List of slime moulds of South Africa
- List of fungi of South Africa
  - List of fungi of South Africa – A
  - List of fungi of South Africa – B
  - List of fungi of South Africa – C
  - List of fungi of South Africa – D
  - List of fungi of South Africa – E
  - List of fungi of South Africa – F
  - List of fungi of South Africa – G
  - List of fungi of South Africa – H
  - List of fungi of South Africa – I
  - List of fungi of South Africa – J
  - List of fungi of South Africa – K
  - List of fungi of South Africa – L
  - List of fungi of South Africa – M
  - List of fungi of South Africa – N
  - List of fungi of South Africa – O
  - List of fungi of South Africa – P
  - List of fungi of South Africa – Q
  - List of fungi of South Africa – R
  - List of fungi of South Africa – S
  - List of fungi of South Africa – T
  - List of fungi of South Africa – U
  - List of fungi of South Africa – V
  - List of fungi of South Africa – W
  - List of fungi of South Africa – X
  - List of fungi of South Africa – Y
  - List of fungi of South Africa – Z
