= Jean Beauverie =

French botanist and mycologist

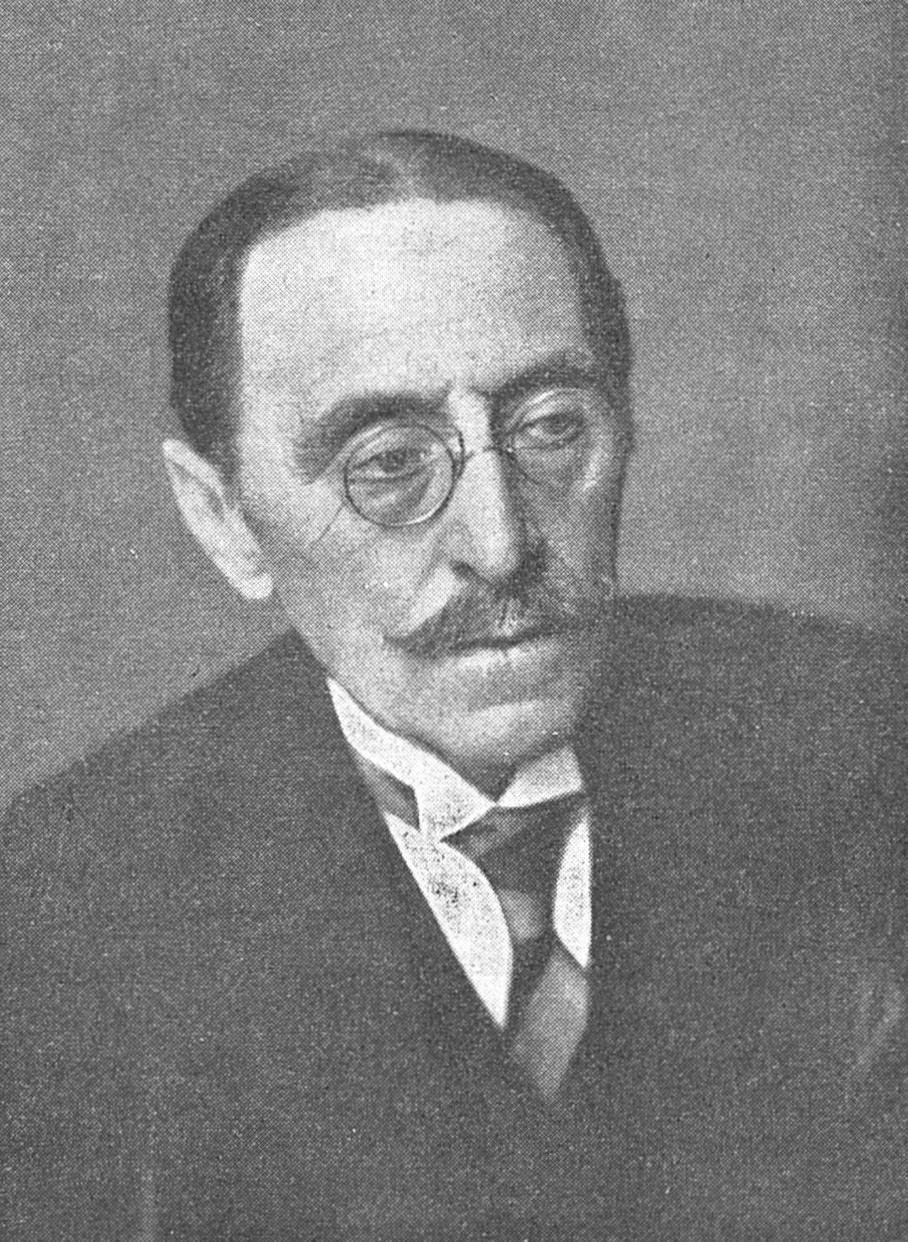
- Jean Beauverie (1874–1938)
- Born: 18 February 1874; Fontaines-sur-Saône
- Died: 22 February 1938 (aged 64); Lyon
- Occupations: botanist and mycologist

Jean Beauverie (18 February 1874 in Fontaines-sur-Saône – 22 February 1938 in Lyon) was a French botanist and mycologist.

In 1894 he obtained his degree in natural sciences, followed by work as a botanical préparateur, then a lecturer, at the University of Lyon. In 1912 he was a lecturer at the faculty of sciences in Nancy, where he eventually became an associate professor. Later he gained a professorship at Clermont-Ferrand, and in 1923 returned as a professor to Lyon.

From 1895 to 1938, he was a member of the Société linnéenne de Lyon, serving as its president on two separate occasions (1907 and 1928). He was also a member of the Société botanique de France (1919), the Société mycologique de France and Société botanique de Lyon (vice-president 1910, president 1912).

In 1912 Jean Paul Vuillemin named the genus Beauveria (family Clavicipitaceae) in his honor for his work the previous year on the type species - B. bassiana - transferring it from Botrytis.

== Selected works ==
- Études sur le polymorphisme des champignons; influence du milieu, 1900 – Studies of polymorphism in mushrooms; environmental influences.
- Étude sur les champignons des maisons, 1903.
- Le bois, 1905.
- Atlas colorié de la flore alpine. Jura, Pyrénées, Alpes françaises, Alpes suisses, 1906 (with Louis Faucheron) – Atlas of alpine flora, Jura, Pyrénées, French Alps and Swiss Alps.
- Les textiles végétaux, 1913 (with M H Lecomte) – plant textiles.
- Les gymnospermes, vivantes et fossiles, 1933 – Gymnosperms, living and fossil.
- Les cryptogames vasculaires, vivantes et fossiles, 1936 – Vascular cryptogams, living and fossil.

== See also ==
- List of mycologists
