= Louis Cutter Wheeler =

American botanist and professor (1910-1980)

- Born: August 2, 1910; La Verne, California
- Died: August 14, 1980 (aged 70)
- Scientific career
- Fields: Botany
- Author abbrev. (botany): L.C.Wheeler

Louis Cutter Wheeler (1910–1980) was an American botanist and professor of botany with an international reputation for his research on Euphorbiaceae.

== Biography ==
Louis Cutter Wheeler's father was a citrus farmer in California, where the summer appearance of the "intricate inflorescence" of Euphorbia albomarginata (rattlesnake weed) aroused Louis's interest in botany. After attending La Verne Junior College, he studied botany from 1931 to 1933 at UCLA under Carl Epling and from 1933 to 1934 at Claremont University College under Philip A. Munz. After graduating in 1934 with a master's degree, Wheeler worked for the U.S. Forest Service in the Siskiyou Mountains and in the Angeles National Forest within the San Gabriel Mountains. From 1936 to 1939 he was a graduate student at Harvard University. He was a co-collector with Bernice Giduz Schubert.

Specialising in the Euphorbiaceae by this time, he published a revision of Euphorbia subgenus Chamaesyce in Canada and the U.S. (except for Florida), giving typifications of 49 taxa. He produced more than 20 other papers between 1934 and 1939, when he was awarded his PhD.

From 1939 to 1945 Wheeler was a botany instructor and research assistant at several different universities. At the University of Southern California, he became an assistant professor in 1945 and was eventually promoted to associate professor and then full professor, retiring as professor emeritus in 1975.

It was in 1969 that his association with Ceylon began as Wheeler was recruited to collaborate on the Flora of Ceylon project, providing an account of the Euphorbiaceae. This led to four visits to the island, where he was disappointed not to be able to carry a gun for protection against dangers he believed he would encounter, such as stampeding elephants. The most alarming occurrence, in reality, was when locals threw cobras into his compound.

The Flora of Ceylon Project was supported by the Smithsonian Institution, the Ceylon Department of Agriculture, and the University of Ceylon, Peradeniya. Funded by the Project, Wheeler collected in the Puttalam District (1969), Anuradhapura District (1971), and Kandy District (1977).

== Family ==
Louis Cutter Wheeler an older brother, Willis Hayes (1906–1996), and 4 sisters, Hazel Ruth (1908–2013), Florence Elizabeth (1914–1920), Muriel Flora (1917–2006), and Janet Lucile (1919–2016). Their father was born in Kansas and arrived in California around 1903 from Colorado. Their mother was born in Massachusetts and belonged to New England's Cutter family, whose history was written by William Richard Cutter. Louis Cutter Wheeler married Leota May Brice (1909–1995) in 1935. They had two daughters. Willis Hayes Wheeler became a plant pathologist and botanist, working for the USDA.

== Selected publications ==
=== Articles ===
- 1938. Lichens of Point Lobos Reserve. The Bryologist Vol. 41, No. 5 (Oct., 1938), pp. 107–113
- 1941 Euphorbia subgenus Chamaesyce in Canada and the United States exclusive of southern Florida. Rhodora 43:97-154, 168–205, 223-286
- 1941 Euphoribaceae of the Washington-Baltimore area . 10 pp.

=== Books ===
- 1973. Cobb Estate Nature Trail. 33 pp. ed. Altadena CA: The Altadenan Publ. Co.

== Eponyms ==
- (Euphorbiaceae) Chamaesyce geyeri var. wheeleriana (Warnock & M.C.Johnst.) Mayfield
- (Euphorbiaceae) Argythamnia wheeleri J.W.Ingram
- (Euphorbiaceae) Phyllanthus wheeleri G.L.Webster
- (Dothioraceae) Metasphaeria wheeleri Linder
