= Pest control of cockchafers =

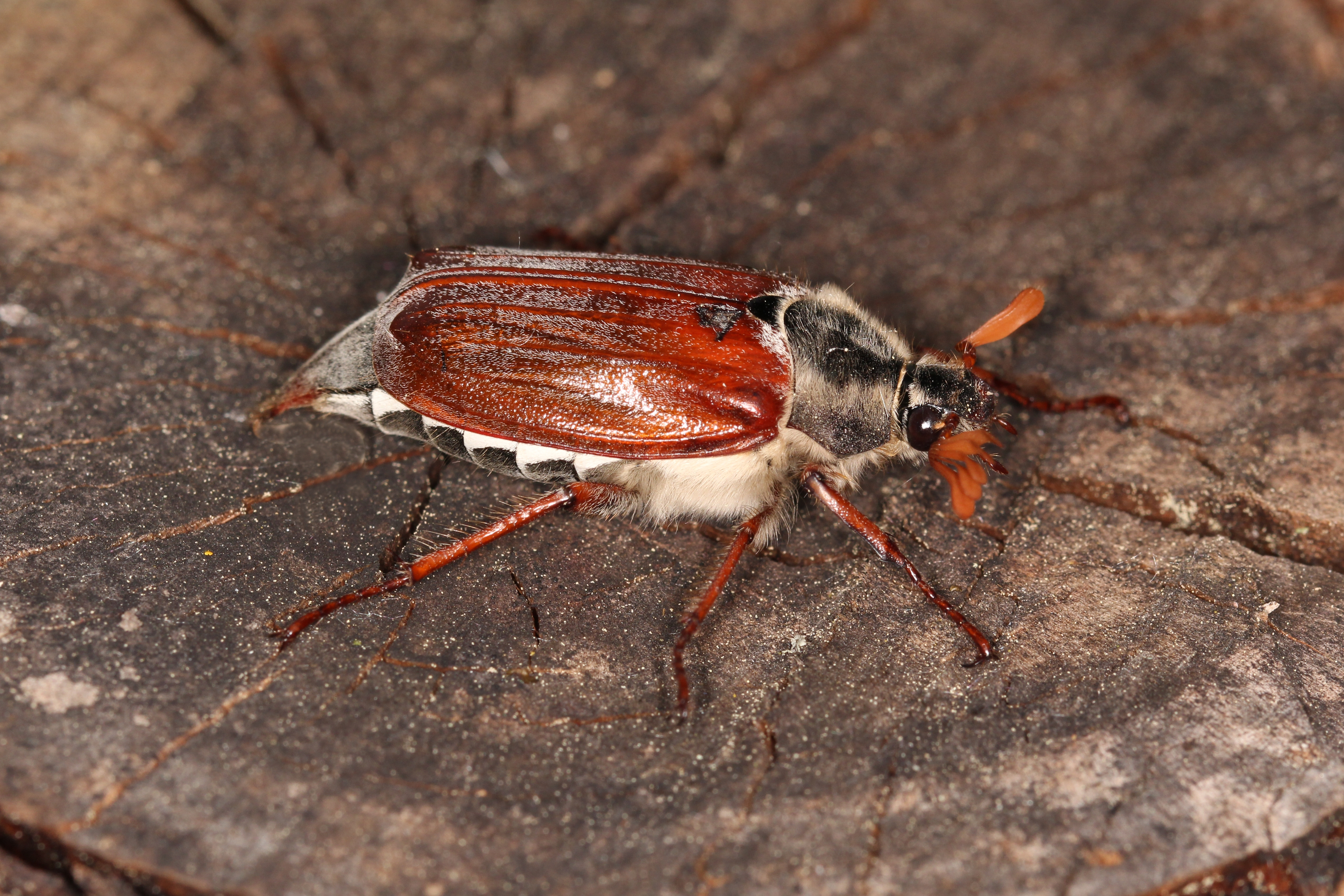
Cockchafer, Maybug or doodlebug; Melolontha melolontha

Cockchafers, such as Melolontha melolontha (the common cockchafer) and Melolontha hippocastani (the forest cockchafer) are Eurasian insects that are agricultural pests. Numerous methods have been tried to control their population growth from the Middle Ages to date.

== Middle ages ==
In an animal trial in 1320, cockchafers were brought to court in Avignon, France, and ordered to withdraw onto a specially designated area within three days; otherwise, they would be outlawed. They were subsequently collected and killed for non-compliance.

== 19th century ==
Both the grubs and adults have a voracious appetite and hence continue to be a major problem in agriculture and forestry. In the pre-industrial era, the main mechanism to control their numbers was to collect and kill the adult beetles, thereby interrupting the cycle. They were once very abundant; in 1911, more than 20 million individuals were collected in 18 square kilometres (6.9 sq mi) of forest.

It has been reported that cockchafers were consumed in parts of Europe during the 19th century. In 1844, German medical officer Johann Joseph Schneider reported that in his hometown of Fulda in Hesse, cockchafers were regularly consumed raw, as well as sugared, candied, and in soup. Schneider described the flavour of the soup as similar to crab soup. However, it is unclear how prevalent the consumption of cockchafers including in soup really was (all recipes for cockchafer soup in German are based on Schneider's 1844 version). It has been suggested that its prevalence has been exaggerated by newspaper stories, leading to it being described as a myth.

In the mid-19th century Sweden, peasants used to predict the weather conditions as mild or severe based on the outer body color of the cockchafer grub. If bluish hue, which happens when the grub is well fed, the weather was found to be mild and when white, the weather was to be severe. Furthermore, if the anterior was white and the posterior part of beetle was blue, the winters were predicted to be very severe early-on. For these reasons, the Swedes called its grub Bemärkelse-mask—prognostic worm.

== Modern times ==
Only with the modernisation of agriculture in the 20th century and the invention of chemical pesticides did it become possible to effectively combat the cockchafer. Combined with the transformation of many pastures into agricultural land, this has resulted in a decrease of the cockchafer to near-extinction in some areas in Europe in the 1970s. In recent years, the cockchafer's numbers have been increasing again, and are spotted in the plains and valleys of Central Switzerland.

Due to legal provisions from the European Union for the sustainable use of pesticides, aerial treatment, which had been used to successfully control M. melolontha populations, is now banned. Light traps have been successful in attracting M. melolontha adults, particularly males, when put at a height of 4 metres (10 ft) above the ground. If a peak swarming time can be identified, shaking isolated trees and collecting feeding adults can reduce population, though it is time consuming. Azadirachtin is a chemical that inhibits M. melolontha's maturation feeding, and egg development but not immediate mortality, although low persistence and difficulty spraying it high enough in trees prevents its widespread use. Another pest control method, soil tilling, can be used for reducing crop damage by M. melolontha but its effectiveness depends on the biological cycle of the beetle e.g., it is effective for M. melolontha grubs and not adults. Pre-cropping as a pest control method works by buckwheat mixed with mustard or other leguminous plants to reduce a significant number of M. melolontha grubs by both weight and population before the crop of interest is planted. Sex pheromones have been used for mass trapping, mating disruption, and "Attract and Kill" methods for M. melolontha. The unlikelihood of developing resistance due to the sex pheromones being produced by M. melolontha makes this a promising method of pest control.

=== Entomopathogens ===
Entomopathogenic organisms—organisms that produce disease in insects—are an active area of research for the control of M. melolontha grub populations. Entomopathogenic fungi is currently being studied as a way to control M. melolontha grub populations. Beauveria brongniartii has been found to be overall ineffective on the species because of a lack of high quality fungi preparation and its inability to blend with the soil, and B. bassiana has been successful with other agricultural pests. B. brongniartii has not been allowed in the EU to be used as a commercial plant protection method and hence not used in cockchafer control. Entomopathogenic nematodes such as Steinernematidae and Heterohabditis, have been found to be particularly successful ways of reducing populations, particularly when M. melolontha larvae are in the first (L1) and second (L2) stage. Entomopathogenic bacteria such as Paenibacillus popillae and several species of Serratia have been found to be varyingly effective on M. melolontha for e.g., P. popillae alone was ineffective on the beetle but combined with B. brogniartii fungi, the disease incidence in the organism had increased. The focus on entomopathogenic bacteria has been on their symbiosis with entomopathogenic nematodes and their ability to act together as a M. melolontha larval control strategy. Poor results with the application of these methods have stemmed an intensive research into the proteolytic enzymes and microbiome of M. melolontha to determine if these factors are acting as a defense against entomopathogenic organisms.
