= Pretenellin A =

Names
- IUPAC name (1E,2E,4E)-1-[5-[(4-hydroxyphenyl)methyl]-2,4-dioxopyrrolidin-3-ylidene]-4,6-dimethylocta-2,4-dien-1-olate

Identifiers
3D model (JSmol)	Interactive image
ChemSpider	78436212
PubChem CID	91820312
- InChI: InChI=1S/C21H25NO4/c1-4-13(2)11-14(3)5-10-18(24)19-20(25)17(22-21(19)26)12-15-6-8-16(23)9-7-15/h5-11,13,17,23-24H,4,12H2,1-3H3,(H,22,26)/p-1/b10-5+,14-11+,19-18+ Key: UHGQPXFZDZCXRO-UDVKGHLSSA-M
- SMILES: CCC(C)/C=C(\C)/C=C/C(=C\1/C(=O)C(NC1=O)CC2=CC=C(C=C2)O)/[O-]

Related compounds
Related compounds	Pretenellin B
- Except where otherwise noted, data are given for materials in their standard state (at 25 °C [77 °F], 100 kPa). Infobox references

Pretenellin A is a secondary metabolite and precursor to the siderophore tenellin in Beauveria bassiana. It undergoes an oxidative ring expansion to form Pretenellin B followed by N-hydroxylation to form tenellin.

== Biosynthesis ==
Pretenellin A is biosynthesized using acetate in the initiation module. The acetate molecule is then extended four times by iterative PKS (Figure 1). The specific methylations occur after the first and second elongation module. After the four elongation module, the β-ketopentaketide is brought into close proximity with tyrosine which is attached to a non-ribosomal peptide synthetase (NRPS) (Figure 2). When the iterative PKS interacts with the NRPS system Pretenellin A is released, acting as a well-regulated off-loading mechanism thus releasing Pretenellin A.

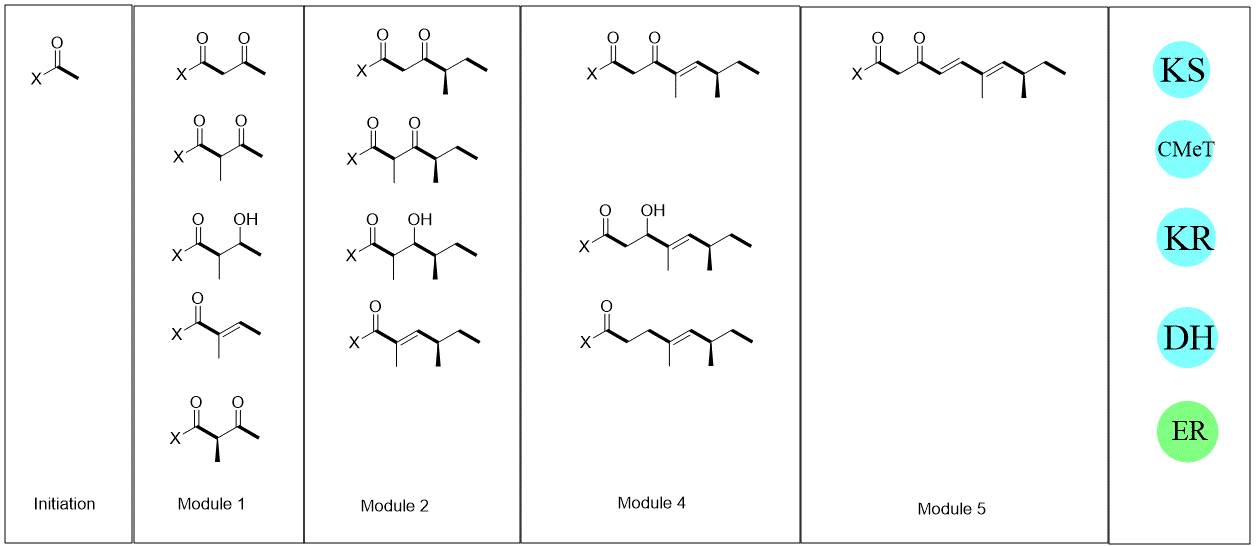
Figure 1: Iterative PKS initiation and elongation modules.

Figure 2: Biosynthesis of Prenellin A. KS= B-ketoacyl synthase; AT= acyl transferase; DH= dehydratase; ER= enoyl reductase; ERo= defective enyl reductase; CMeT= C-methyl transferase; KR= B=ketoacyl reductase; ACP= acyl carrier protein; C= condensation; A= adenylation; T= thiolation; DKC= Dieckmann cyclase
