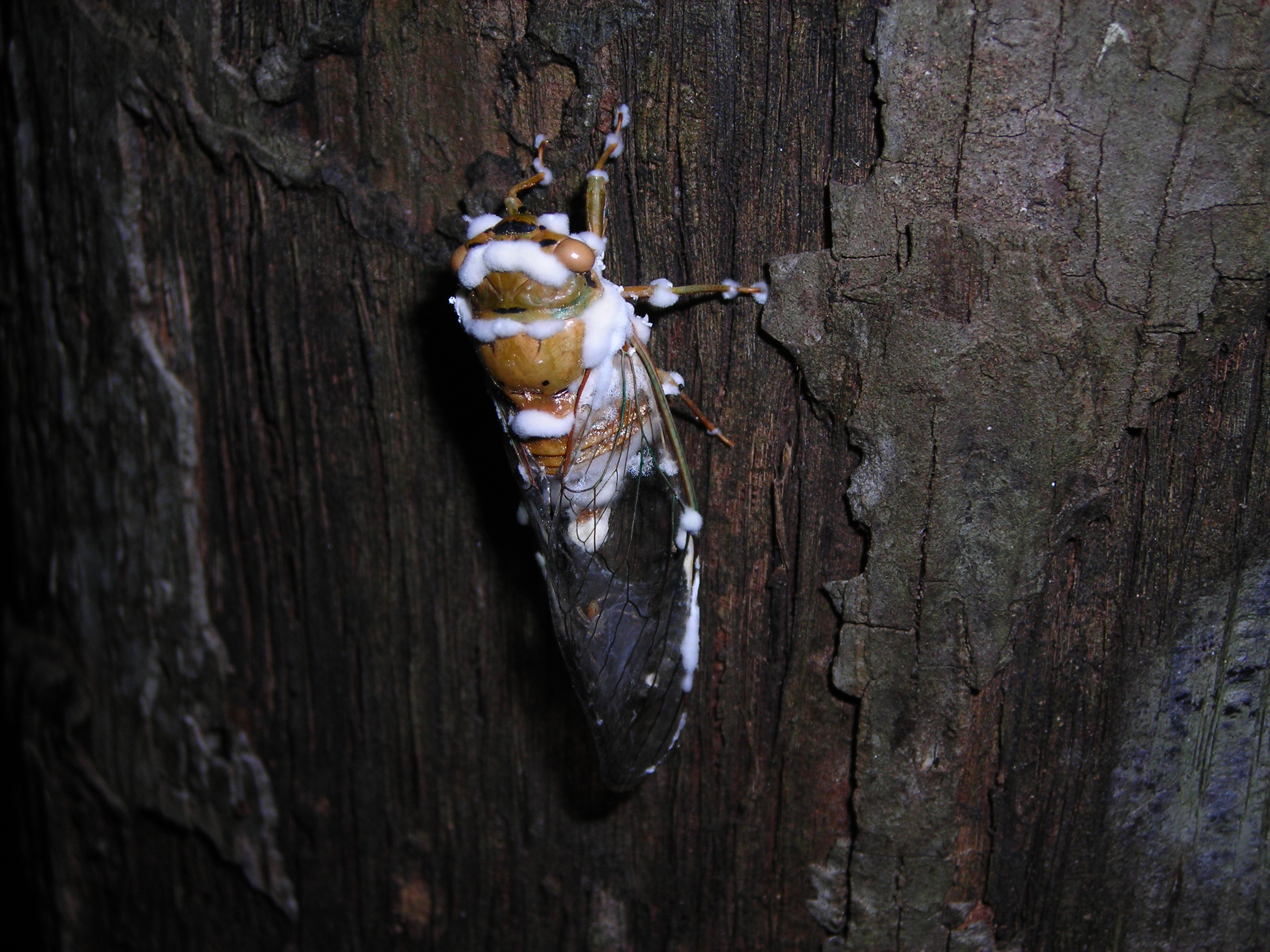
- Cicada killed by Beauveria

Scientific classification
- Kingdom: Fungi
- Division: Ascomycota
- Class: Sordariomycetes
- Order: Hypocreales
- Family: Cordycipitaceae
- Genus: Beauveria; Vuill. (1912)

Type species
- Beauveria bassiana (Bals.-Criv.) Vuill.

= Beauveria =

Genus of fungi

Beauveria is a genus of asexually-reproducing fungi allied with the ascomycete family Cordycipitaceae. Its several species are typically insect pathogens. The sexual states (teleomorphs) of Beauveria species, where known, are species of Cordyceps sensu stricto.

Beauveria species are white entomopathogenic fungi. They form unicellular conidia that are typically hydrophobic and very small. The conidia are formed holoblastically from basally inflated conidiogenous cells. After conidium production, the conidiogenous cell elongates before producing another conidium atop a small denticle (a narrow projection bearing a conidium or sporangium). The result is the formation of a distinctive, slender, zig-zag rachis. Colonies of Beauveria species are typically white or off-white on artificial culture media.

Species of Tritirachium resemble Beauveria species in having a zig-zag conidiogenous cells, but differ in lacking conspicuous denticles and in producing yellow-brown to purple colonies.

Beauveria species are commonly found associated with insects or habitats supporting insects, including soil and private dwellings. B. bassiana, the most widely known member of this genus, has been developed as a biological pesticide for various insect pests.

== Species ==
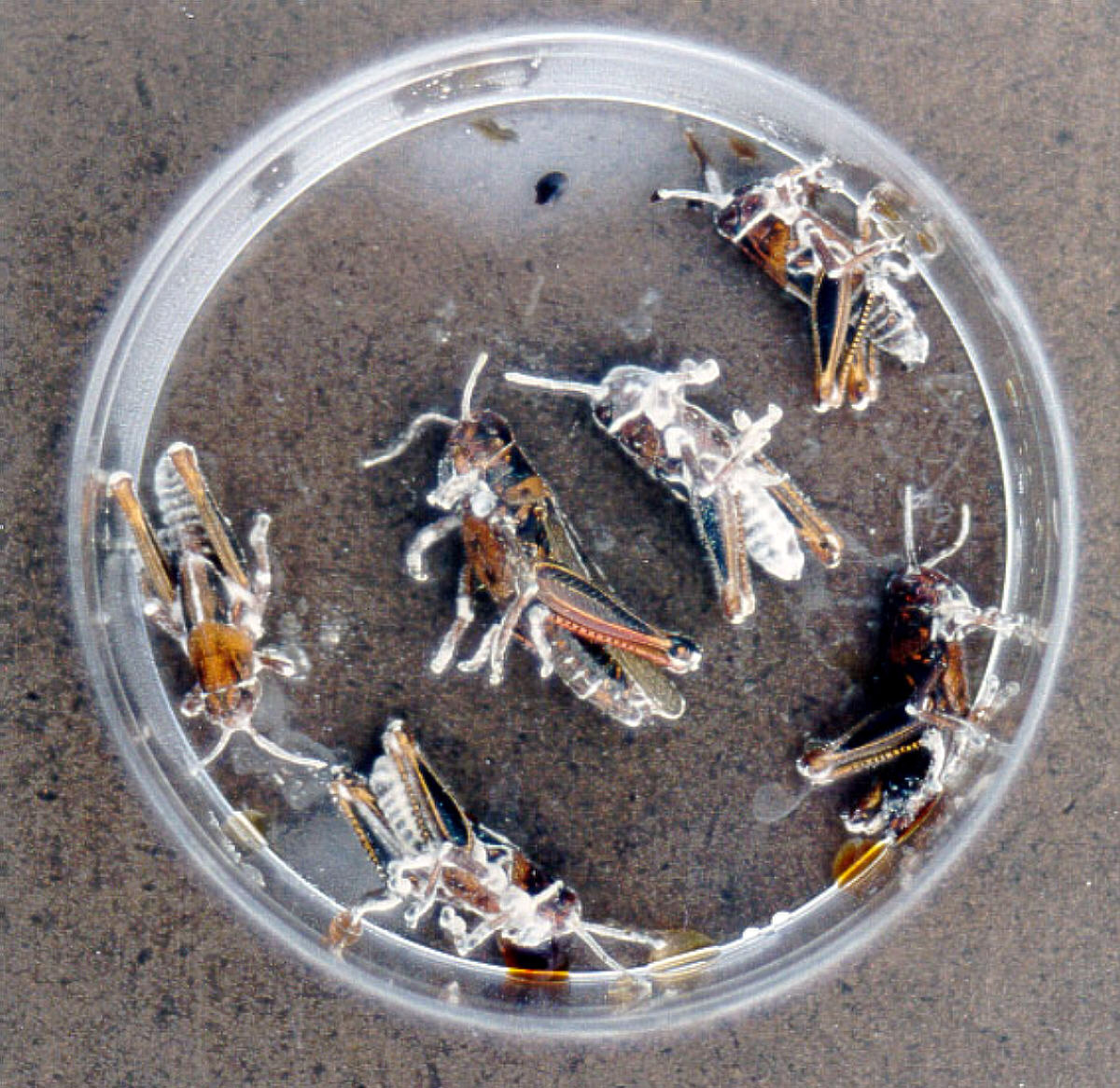
Sporulation in grasshoppers

A multilocus phylogeny of Beauveria based on partial sequences of RPB1, RPB2, TEF and the nuclear intergenic region, Bloc, has been described to assess diversity within the genus and to evaluate the taxonomic status of species. B. bassiana and B. brongniartii, both of which represent species complexes and which previously lacked type specimens, were redescribed and types are proposed in this paper. In addition six new species were described including B. varroae and B. kipukae, which form a biphyletic, morphologically cryptic sister lineage to B. bassiana. B. sungii is an Asian species that is linked to an undetermined species of Cordyceps. The combination B. amorpha was considered validly published; previous literature also refers to invalid B. felina and B. globulifera.

=== List of Beauveria species ===
- Beauveria alba
- Beauveria amorpha
- Beauveria arenaria
- Beauveria asiatica
- Beauveria australis
- Beauveria bassiana
- Beauveria brongniartii
- Beauveria brumptii
- Beauveria caledonica
- Beauveria chiromensis
- Beauveria coccorum
- Beauveria cretacea
- Beauveria cylindrospora
- Beauveria delacroixii
- Beauveria densa
- Beauveria dependens
- Beauveria doryphorae
- Beauveria effusa
- Beauveria epigaea
- Beauveria felina
- Beauveria geodes
- Beauveria globulifera
- Beauveria heimii
- Beauveria hoplocheli
- Beauveria kipukae
- Beauveria laxa
- Beauveria malawiensis
- Beauveria medogensis
- Beauveria melolonthae
- Beauveria nubicola
- Beauveria oryzae
- Beauveria paradoxa
- Beauveria paranensis
- Beauveria parasitica
- Beauveria petelotii
- Beauveria pseudobassiana
- Beauveria rileyi
- Beauveria rubra
- Beauveria shiotae
- Beauveria sobolifera
- Beauveria spicata
- Beauveria stephanoderis
- Beauveria sulfurescens
- Beauveria sungii
- Beauveria tenella
- Beauveria tundrensis
- Beauveria velata
- Beauveria varroae
- Beauveria vermiconia
- Beauveria vexans
- Beauveria viannai
- Beauveria virella

B. simplex is now Acrodontium simplex; B. nivea is Tolypocladium inflatum.
