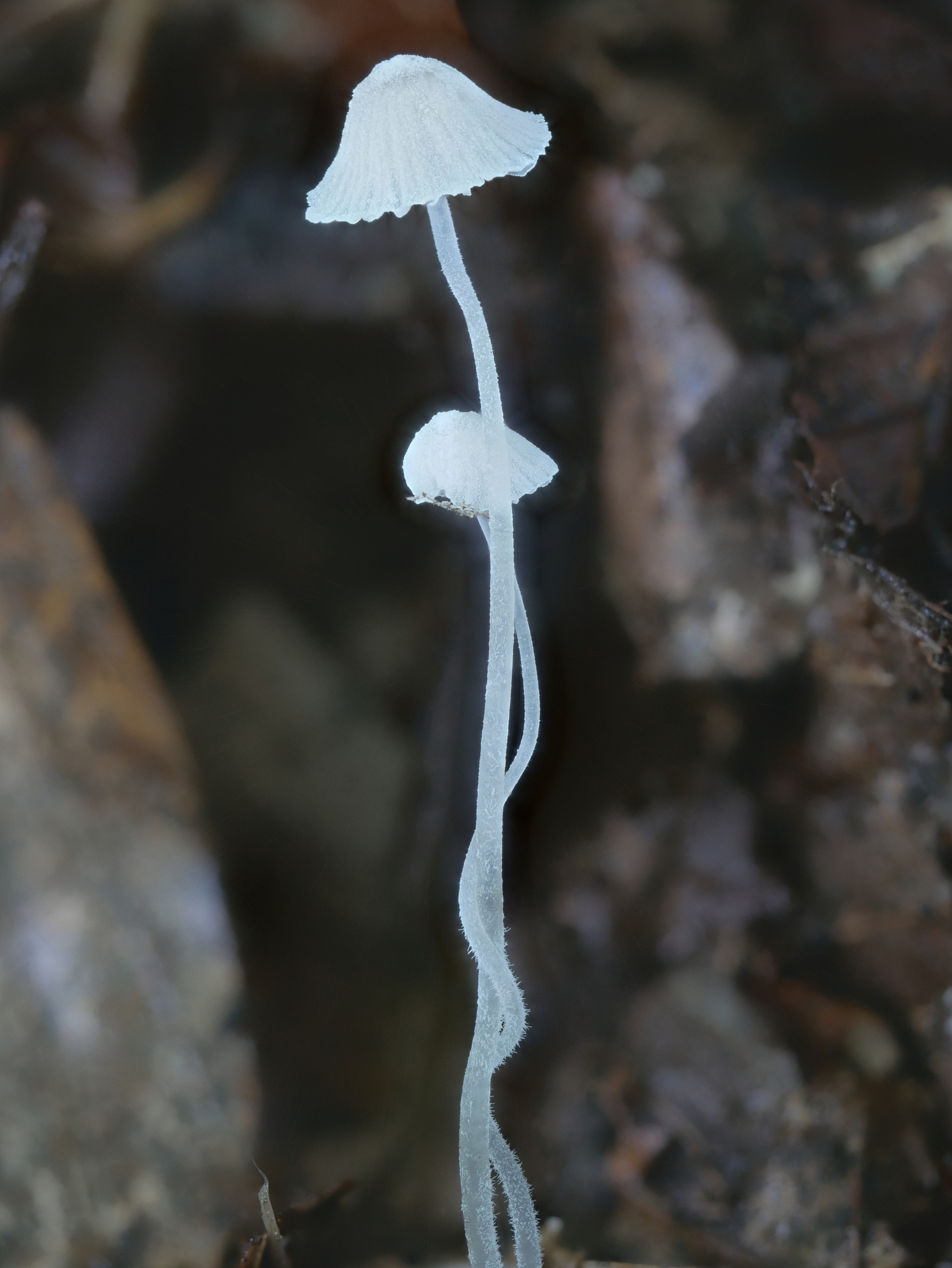

Scientific classification
- Kingdom: Fungi
- Division: Basidiomycota
- Class: Agaricomycetes
- Order: Agaricales
- Family: Mycenaceae
- Genus: Mycena
- Species: M. alphitophora

Binomial name
- Mycena alphitophora (Berk.) Sacc. (1887)

Synonyms
- Agaricus alphitophorus Berk. (1877); Mycena osmundicola J.E.Lange (1914); Mycena osmundicola subsp. imleriana Kühner (1938); Mycena osmundicola var. imleriana (Kühner) A.Pearson (1952); Prunulus alphitophorus (Berk.) Murrill (1916)

= Mycena alphitophora =

Species of fungus

Mycena alphitophora is a species of agaric fungus in the family Mycenaceae. Its small, white, delicate fruit bodies are characterized by the powdery coatings on the surfaces of both the cap and stipe. The stipe base is not swollen or disk-like. The stipe surface is more hairy than Mycena adscendens.

== Taxonomy ==
The species was first described as Agaricus alphitophorus by Miles Joseph Berkeley in 1877, based on specimens collected in 1873 from the Devonshire Marsh, a peatland in Bermuda. Pier Andrea Saccardo transferred it to the genus Mycena in 1887. William Alphonso Murrill placed the species in Prunulus in 1916. Jakob Emanuel Lange's Mycena osmundicola, published in 1914, is a synonym. P. Manimohan and K.M. Leelavathy defined the varieties distincta and globispora from southern India in 1989. It is classified in the section Saccharifera of Mycena.

=== Similar species ===
Mycena adscendens has a swollen or disk-like stipe base; also, the stipe surface is more densely hairy with caulocystida. Mycena stylobates has a pruinose stipe that arises from a basal disc, but the cap is up to 10 mm and lacks white granules. White Hemimycena species lack granules and all have inamyloid spores.
