= Jean Paul Vuillemin =

French mycologist (1861–1932)

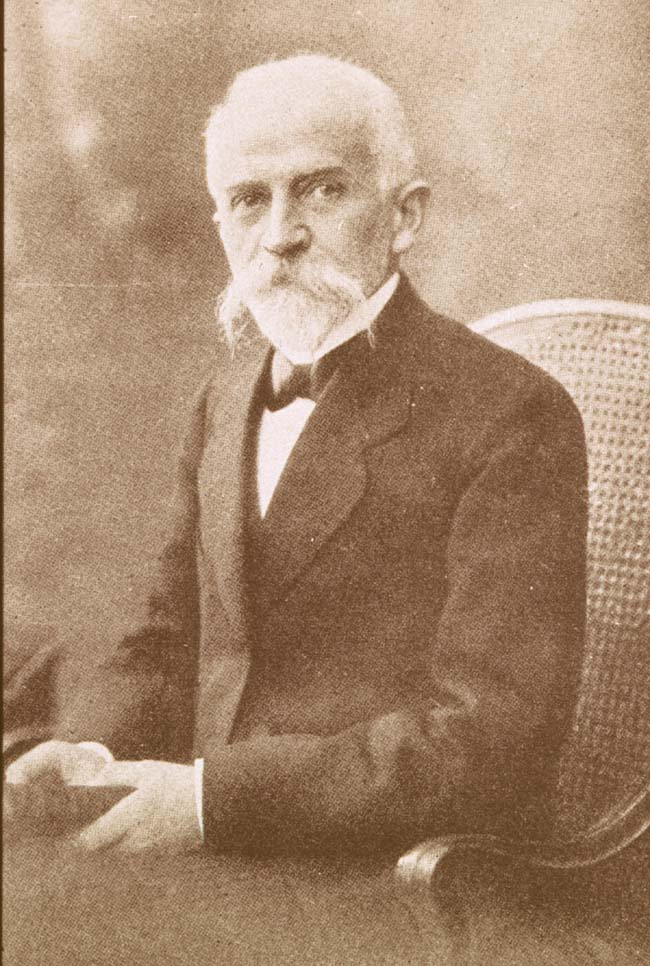
Jean Paul Vuillemin (1861-1932)

Jean Paul Vuillemin (13 February 1861 – 25 September 1932 in Malzéville) was a French mycologist born in Docelles.

He studied at the University of Nancy, earning his medical doctorate in 1884. In 1892 he obtained his doctorate in sciences at the Sorbonne, and from 1895 to 1932 he was a professor of natural history at the medical faculty in Nancy.

He described the genera Spinalia and Zygorhynchus. The mushroom genus Vuilleminia (Maire) is named after him. In 1889 he employed the term "antibiotic" when describing the substance pyocyanin.

In 1901 he transferred the yeast-like fungus that was named Saccharomyces hominis by Otto Busse and Saccharomyces neoformans by Francesco Sanfelice to the genus Cryptococcus due to its absence of ascospores. The French Academy of Sciences awarded him the Prix Montagne for 1902.

In 1912 Vuillemin created the genus Beauveria to honor Jean Beauverie for his work the previous year on the type species - B. bassiana - transferring it from Botrytis.

== Selected works ==
- Sur les homologies des mousses, 1886 – On homology regarding mosses.
- Les Tubercules radicaux des légumineuses, 1888 – On radical tubercules of legumes.
- Les champignons, 1912 – Fungi.
- Les animaux infectieux, 1929 – Infectious animals.
- Les Champignons parasites et les mycoses de l'homme, 1931 – Parasitic fungi and human mycoses.
