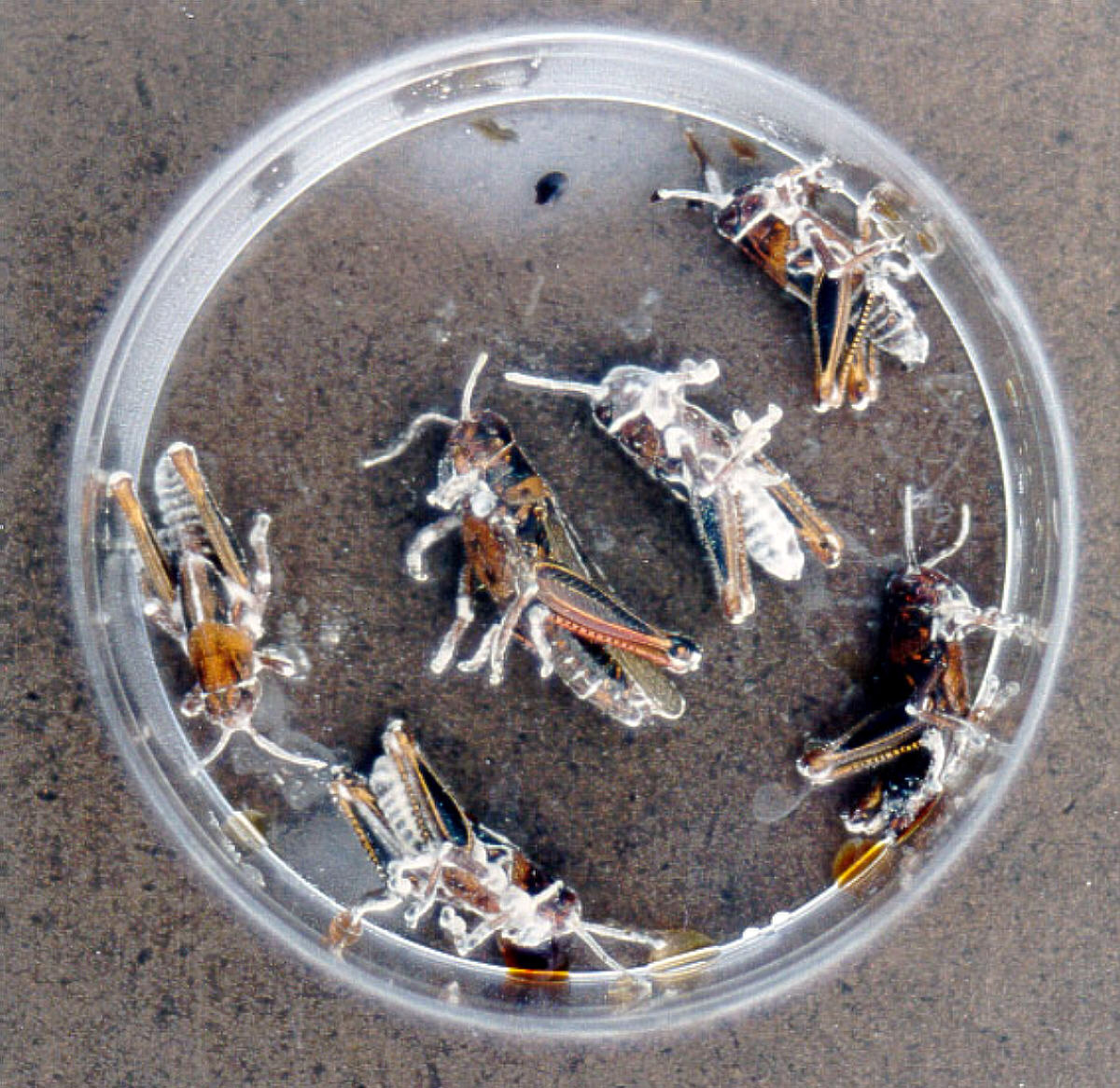
- Grasshoppers killed by B. bassiana

Scientific classification
- Kingdom: Fungi
- Division: Ascomycota
- Class: Sordariomycetes
- Order: Hypocreales
- Family: Cordycipitaceae
- Genus: Beauveria
- Species: B. bassiana

Binomial name
- Beauveria bassiana (Bals.-Criv.) Vuill. (1912)

Synonyms
- Botrytis bassiana Bals.-Criv. (1836) (basionym); several others: see Species fungorum

= Beauveria bassiana =

Species of fungus

Beauveria bassiana is a fungus that grows naturally in soils throughout the world and acts as a parasite on various arthropod species, causing white muscardine disease; it thus belongs to the group of entomopathogenic fungi. It is used as a biological insecticide to control a number of pests, including termites, thrips, whiteflies, aphids, and various beetles. Its use in the control of bed bugs and malaria-transmitting mosquitos is under investigation.

== Taxonomy ==
The species is named after Italian entomologist Agostino Bassi, who discovered it in 1835 in silkworms (Bombyx mori). Bassi performed the first infection experiments, and determined the fungus to be the cause of the muscardine disease, which then led to carriers transmitting it by airborne means. Later the same year, the fungus was named Botrytis bassiana by Giuseppe Gabriel Balsamo-Crivelli. The species epithet honours Bassi, the discoverer.

In 1911, Jean Beauverie did further study, and the next year, Jean Paul Vuillemin made it the type species of his new genus, Beauveria, a name that honors Beauverie.

The name B. bassiana has long been used to describe a species complex of morphologically similar and closely related isolates. Rehner and Buckley have shown that B. bassiana consists of many distinct lineages that should be recognized as distinct phylogenetic species and the genus Beauveria was redescribed with a proposed type for B. bassiana in 2011.

The species was formerly also known as Tritirachium shiotae, among other synonyms.

=== Relation to Cordyceps and other fungi ===
Beauveria bassiana is the anamorph (asexually reproducing form) of Cordyceps bassiana. The latter teleomorph (the sexually reproducing form) has been collected only in eastern Asia.

== Description ==
B. bassiana is a white mold when grown on culture, producing white spore balls made up of many conidia that are single-celled, haploid, and hydrophobic. The short, ovoid conidiogenous cells that produce the conidia have a narrow apical extension called a rachis, which elongates into a long zig-zag extension.

== Ecology ==
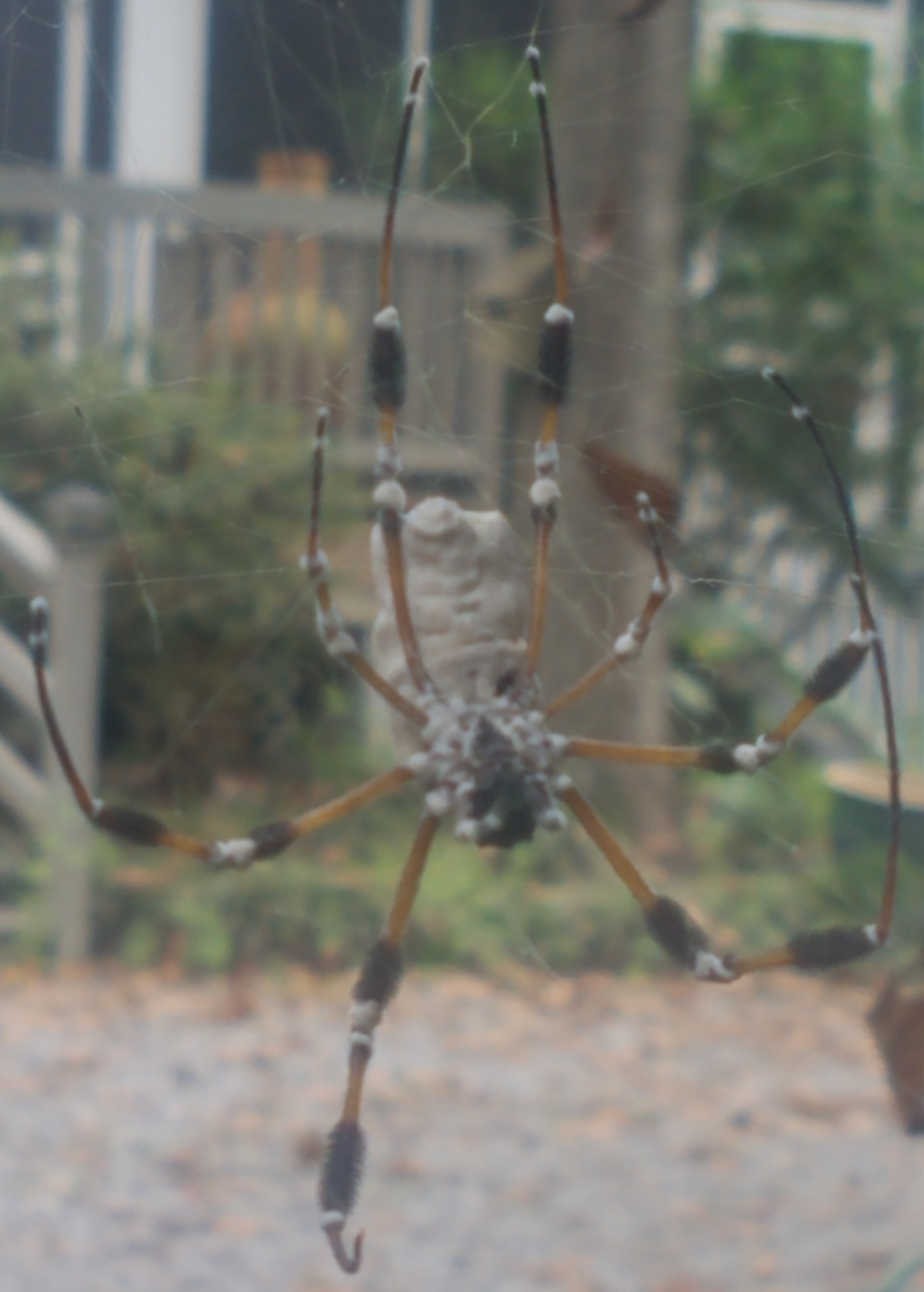
Spotted in St. Tammany Parish, Louisiana, a golden silk orb-weaver is dead from white muscardine disease with white mold emerging from the cadaver's joints and pores.

The insect disease caused by the fungus is a muscardine, which has been called white muscardine disease. When the microscopic spores of the fungus come into contact with the body of an insect host, they germinate, penetrate the cuticle, and grow inside, killing the insect within a matter of days. Afterwards, a white mold emerges from the cadaver and produces new spores. A typical isolate of B. bassiana can attack a broad range of insects; various isolates differ in their host range.

B. bassiana parasitizing the Colorado potato beetle has been reported to be, in turn, the host of a mycoparasitic fungus Syspastospora parasitica. This organism also attacks related insect-pathogenic species of the Clavicipitaceae.

A fungus attributed to be B. bassiana was observed to cause infections in a captive American alligator and B. bassiana was implicated in causing a pulmonary disease in captive tortoises. The reptiles were in captivity and under temperature stress which may explain their susceptibility to the fungus. When a tortoise was kept at 22 °C and injected with 0.5 mL of 106 spores of B. bassiana into the lung, no mortality was observed, while a second contaminated tortoise died when kept only at 16 °C.

A microevolutionary experiment in 2013 showed that the greater wax moth (Galleria mellonella) was able to adapt its defense mechanisms during 25 generations, while being under constant selective pressure from B. bassiana. The moth developed resistance, but apparently at a cost.

Wagner and Lewis reported the ability of B. bassiana to grow as an endophyte in corn.

Beauveria bassiana has also been used as a biological control agent against the western flower thrips (Frankliniella occidentalis), a common pest in horticultural crops. Under laboratory conditions, mortality generally increases with conidial concentration, showing a typical dose–response pattern.

Environmental conditions can strongly affect infection success. In particular, high relative humidity is usually required for spores to germinate and infect the host. The characteristics of the plant surface may also influence the outcome, since features such as leaf structure can affect how well conidia attach and persist.

== Toxicity ==
The fungus rarely infects humans or other animals, so it is generally considered safe as an insecticide. However, at least one case of human infection by B. bassiana has been reported in a person with a suppressed immune system. Additionally, the spores may exacerbate breathing difficulties.

== Uses ==
B. bassiana can be used as a biological insecticide to control a number of pests such as termites, whiteflies, and many other insects. Its use in the control of malaria-transmitting mosquitos is under investigation. As an insecticide, the spores are sprayed on affected crops as an emulsified suspension or wettable powder or applied to mosquito nets as a mosquito control agent.

As a species, B. bassiana parasitizes a very wide range of arthropod hosts. However, different strains vary in their host ranges, some having rather narrow ranges, like strain Bba 5653 that is very virulent to the larvae of the diamondback moth and kills only few other types of caterpillars. Some strains do have a wide host range, so should be considered nonselective biological insecticides. These should not be applied to flowers visited by pollinating insects. Known targets of the species include:

- Aphids
- Whiteflies
- Mealybugs
- Psyllids
  - Chinch bug
  - Lygus bugs
- Grasshoppers
- Stink bugs (Halyomorpha halys)
- Thrips
- Termites
- Fire ants
- Flies
- Stem borers
  - Fungal gnats
  - Shoreflies
- Beetles
  - Bark beetle
  - Black vine weevil
  - Boll weevil
  - Cereal leaf beetle
  - Coffee berry borer
  - Colorado potato beetle
  - Emerald ash borer (in conjunction with the parasitoid wasp Tetrastichus planipennisi)
  - Japanese beetle
  - Mexican bean beetle
  - Red palm weevil
  - Strawberry root weevil
- Caterpillars
  - Codling moth
  - Douglas fir tussock moth
  - European corn borer
  - Invasive silkworms
  - Apple clearwing moth
- Mites

Preliminary research has shown the fungus is 100% effective in eliminating bed bugs exposed to cotton fabric sprayed with fungus spores. It is also effective against bed bug colonies due to B. bassiana carried by infected bugs back to their harborages. The tested strain of B. bassiana caused rapid mortality (3–5 days) after short-term exposure. In a 2017 follow-up study, pyrethroid-resistant bed bugs had >94% mortality after treatment with a commercial preparation of B. bassiana.

== Containment leak ==
In March 2013, genetically modified B. bassiana was found in a number of research laboratories and greenhouses outside of a designated containment area at Lincoln University in Christchurch, New Zealand. The Ministry for Primary Industries investigated the leak. The modification only involved the addition of marker genes for easier detection of the fungus. It is unlikely to cause any additional harm relative to existing B. bassiana in the environment. It has also not been detected beyond the laboratories and greenhouses.

== Gallery ==
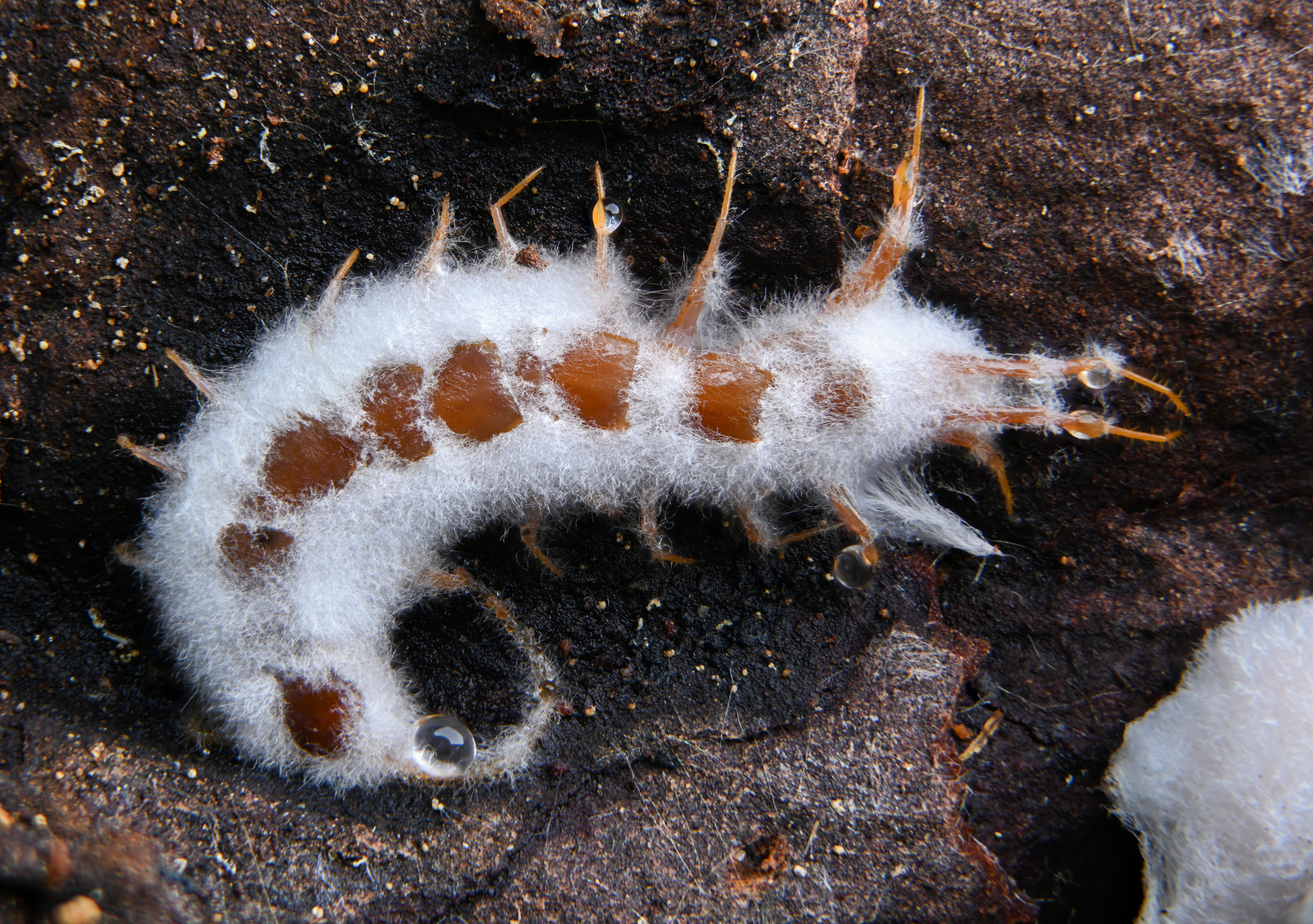

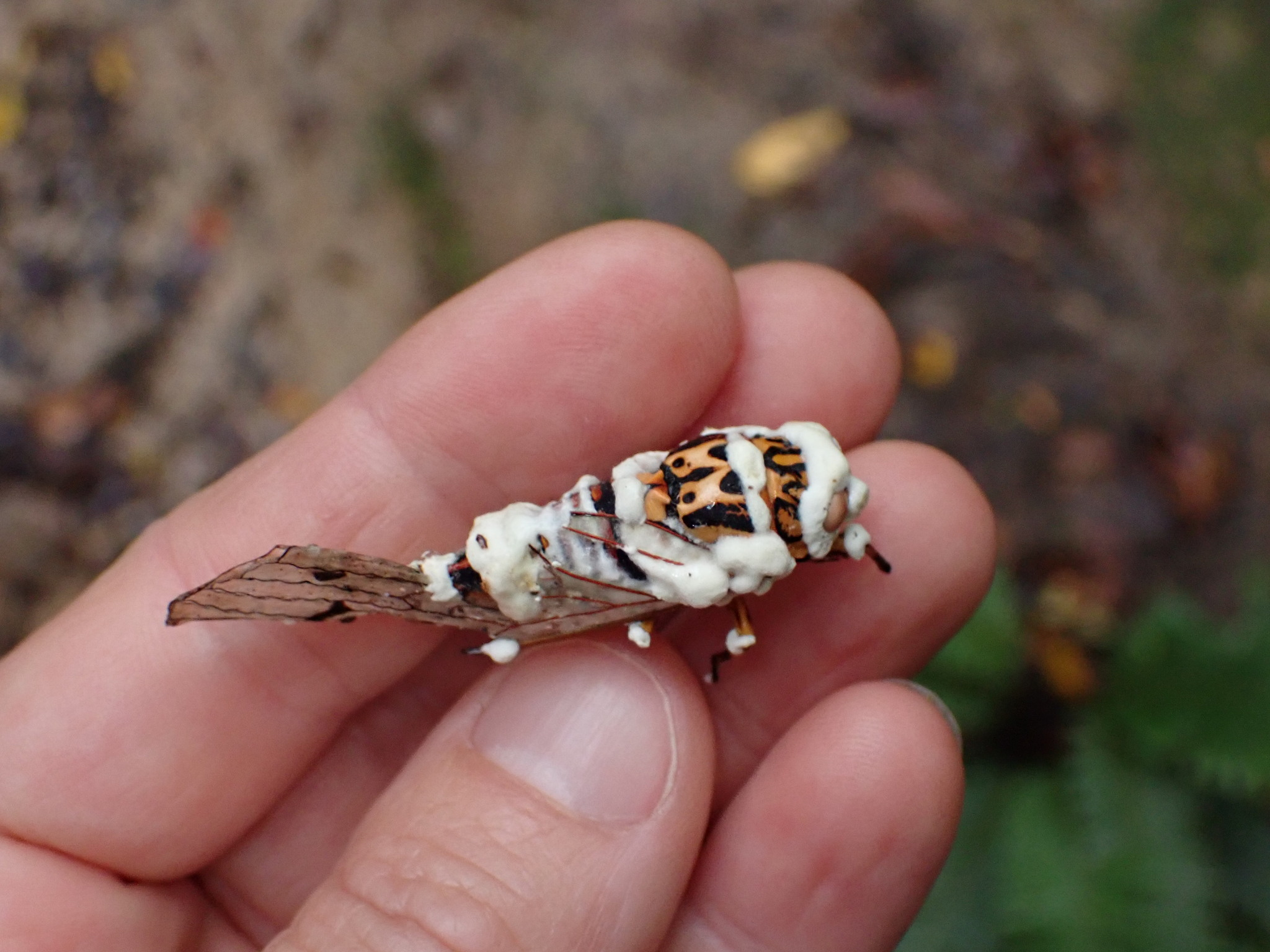

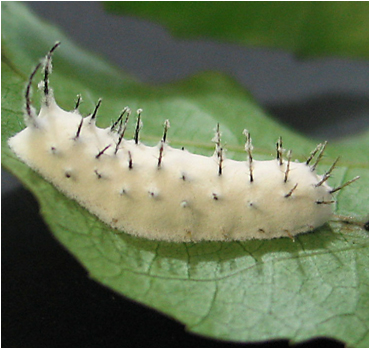

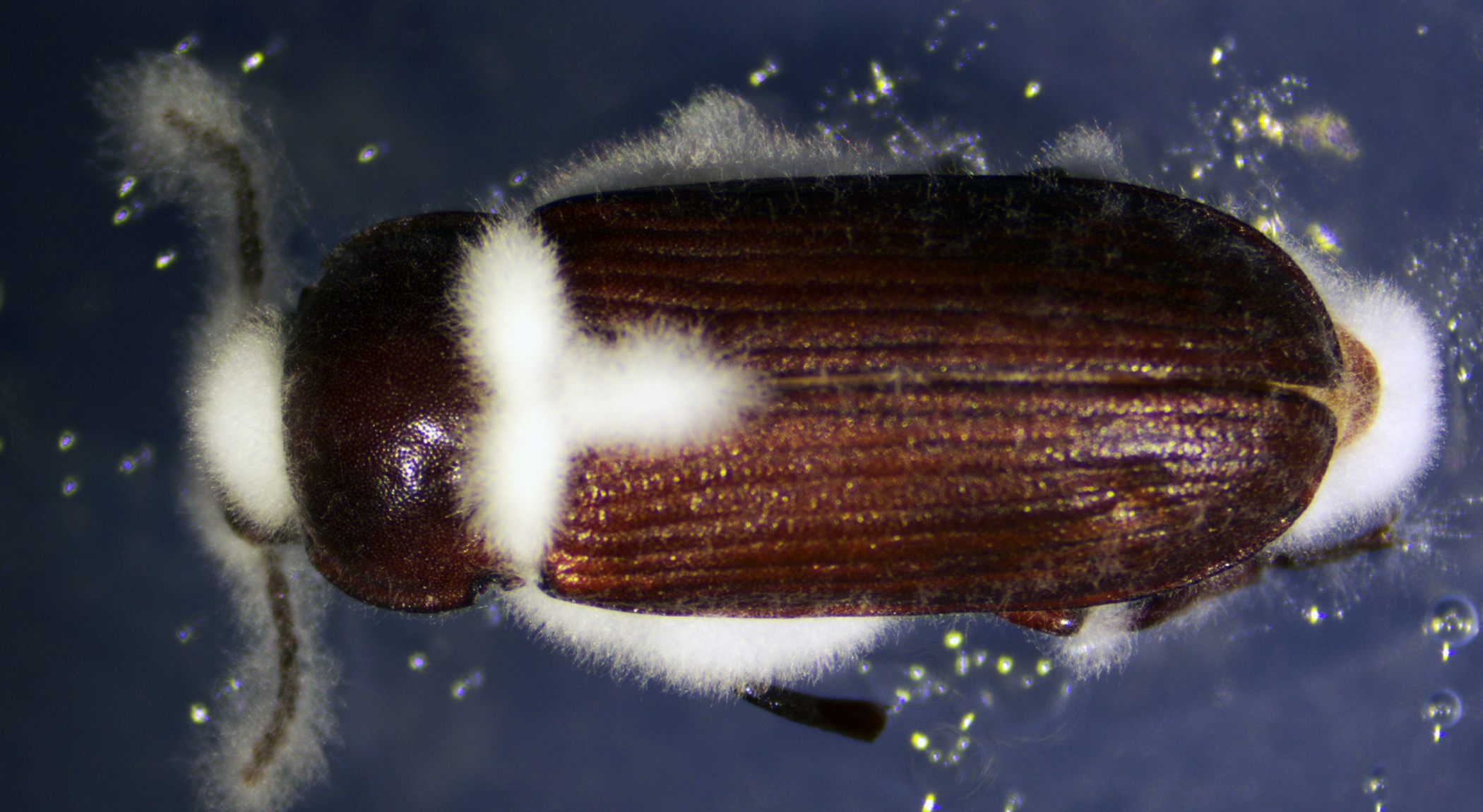

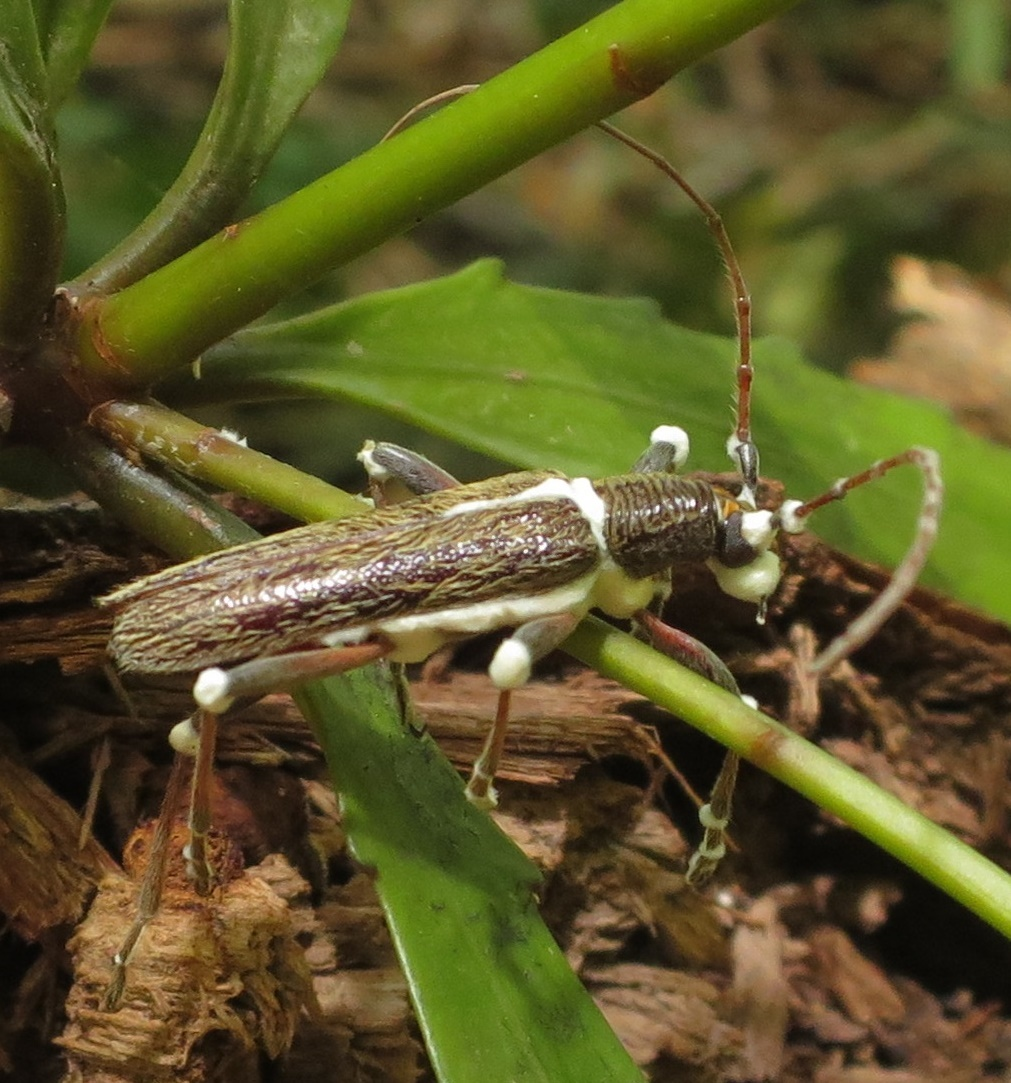

== See also ==
- Biological insecticides
- Metarhizium spp. which cause "green muscardine" disease
