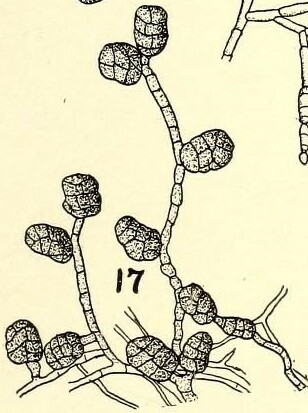
- Macrosporium sarcinula on leached agar

Scientific classification
- Kingdom: Fungi
- Division: Ascomycota
- Class: Dothideomycetes
- Order: Pleosporales
- Family: Pleosporaceae
- Genus: Macrosporium; Fries, 1832

= Macrosporium =

Genus of fungi

Macrosporium is a genus of fungi belonging to the family Pleosporaceae.

The genus has almost cosmopolitan distribution.

== Species ==
Species:

- Macrosporium abruptum Cooke & Ellis
- Macrosporium abutilonis Pass.
- Macrosporium agaves Sawada
