= Giuseppe Gabriel Balsamo-Crivelli =

Italian zoologist (1800–1874)

- Born: 1 September 1800; Milan
- Died: 15 November 1874 (aged 74); Pavia
- Occupation: Naturalist

Giuseppe Gabriel Balsamo-Crivelli (1 September 1800, in Milan – 15 November 1874, in Pavia) was an Italian naturalist.

He became a professor of mineralogy and zoology at the University of Pavia in 1851, and was appointed professor of comparative anatomy in 1863. He was interested in various domains of natural history, and identified the fungus responsible for the white muscardine disease of silkworms, Beauveria bassiana.

With Giuseppe De Notaris, he published Prodromus bryologiae Mediolanensis (1834) and edited the exsiccata Musci Mediolanenses, collecti et editi a Josepho Balsamo et Josepho de Notaris (1833-1838).
