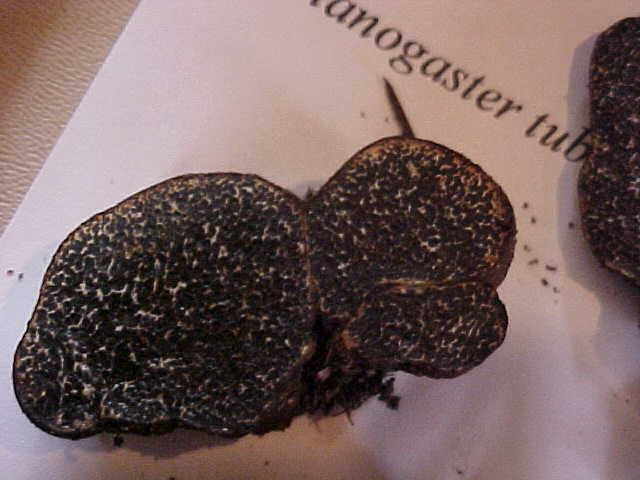
- Melanogaster tuberiformis

Scientific classification
- Domain: Eukaryota
- Kingdom: Fungi
- Division: Basidiomycota
- Class: Agaricomycetes
- Order: Boletales
- Family: Paxillaceae
- Genus: Melanogaster; Corda

Type species
- Melanogaster tuberiformis Corda

Synonyms
- Argylium Wallr.; Uperhiza Bosc; Hyperrhiza Bosc; Bulliardia Jungh.; Bullardia Jungh.

= Melanogaster (fungus) =

Genus of fungi

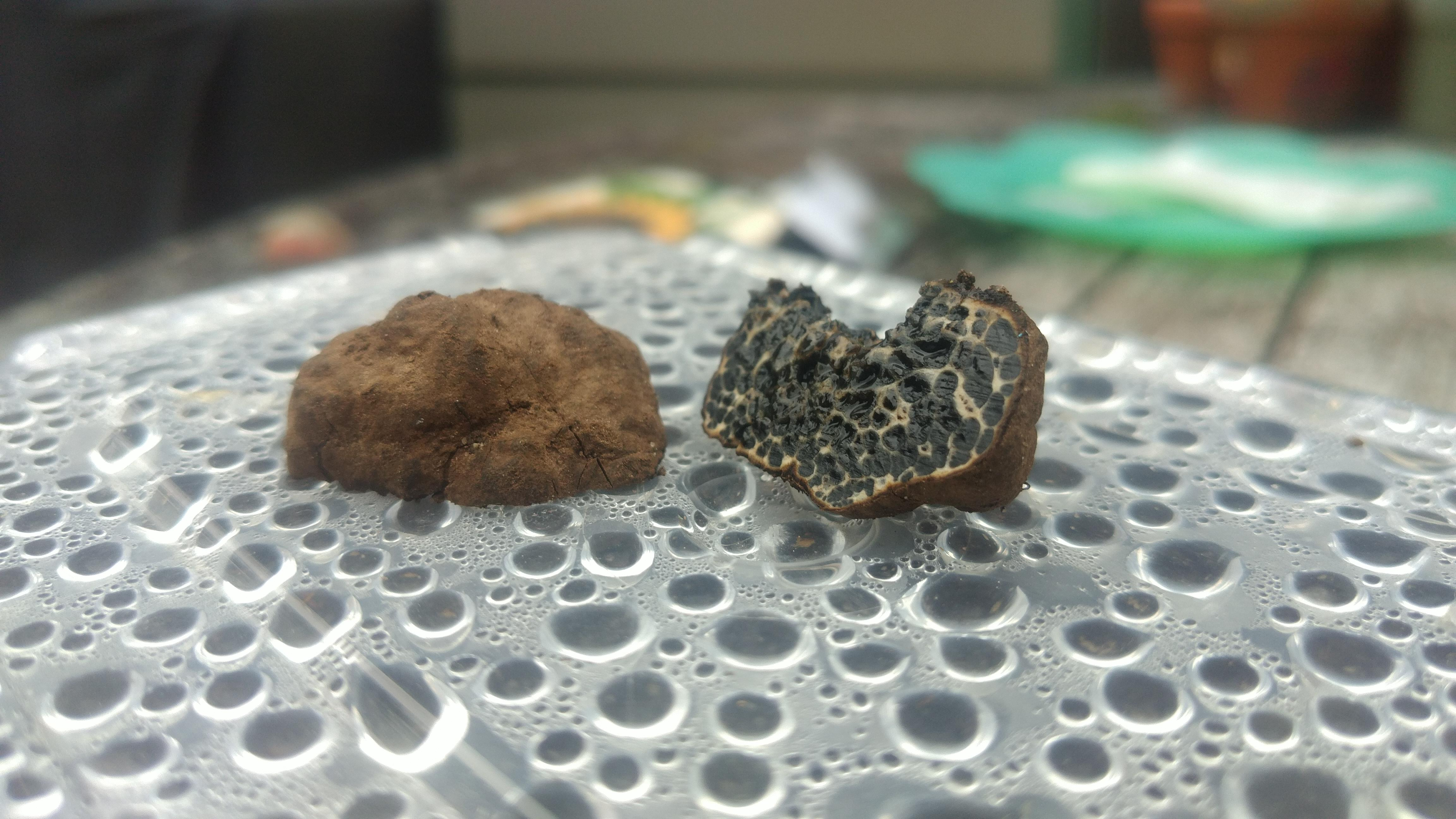
Melanogaster cross section

Melanogaster is a genus of fungus that resemble truffles, and are often mistaken for them. However, they do not have the characteristic aroma and value of truffles, although some have been used culinarily. None are known to be poisonous. The genus contains 25 species that collectively have a widespread distribution.

A new polyene pigment, melanocrocin, has been isolated either from fruit bodies or mycelial cultures of the subterranean fungus Melanogaster broomeianus. The structure of the pigment was determined by spectroscopic methods and chemical transformations. Melanocrocin is the N-acyl derivative of L-phenylalanine methyl ester with a polyolefinic carboxylic acid.

== Species ==
- Melanogaster ambiguus
- Melanogaster broomeiani
- Melanogaster variegatus
- Melanogaster tuberiformis
- Melanogaster broomeianus
- Melanogaster wilsonii
