= Mycoporaceae =

Scientific classification
- Kingdom: Fungi
- Division: Ascomycota
- Class: Dothideomycetes
- Order: Pleosporales
- Family: Mycoporaceae; Zahlbr.

Type genus
- Mycoporum Flot. ex Nyl.

Genera
- Bottaria; Mycoporum Flot. ex Nyl.

Family of fungi

The Mycoporaceae are a family of fungi in the order Pleosporales.
