= Microdiplodia =

Scientific classification
- Domain: Eukaryota
- Kingdom: Fungi
- Division: Ascomycota
- Class: Dothideomycetes
- Order: Botryosphaeriales
- Family: Botryosphaeriaceae
- Genus: Microdiplodia; Allesch., 1901

Genus of fungi

Microdiplodia is a genus of fungi belonging to the family Botryosphaeriaceae.

The genus has almost cosmopolitan distribution.

== Species ==
Species:

- Microdiplodia abiegna (Maubl.) Sacc. & D.Sacc.
- Microdiplodia abramovii Nelen
- Microdiplodia abutilonis Khokhr.
