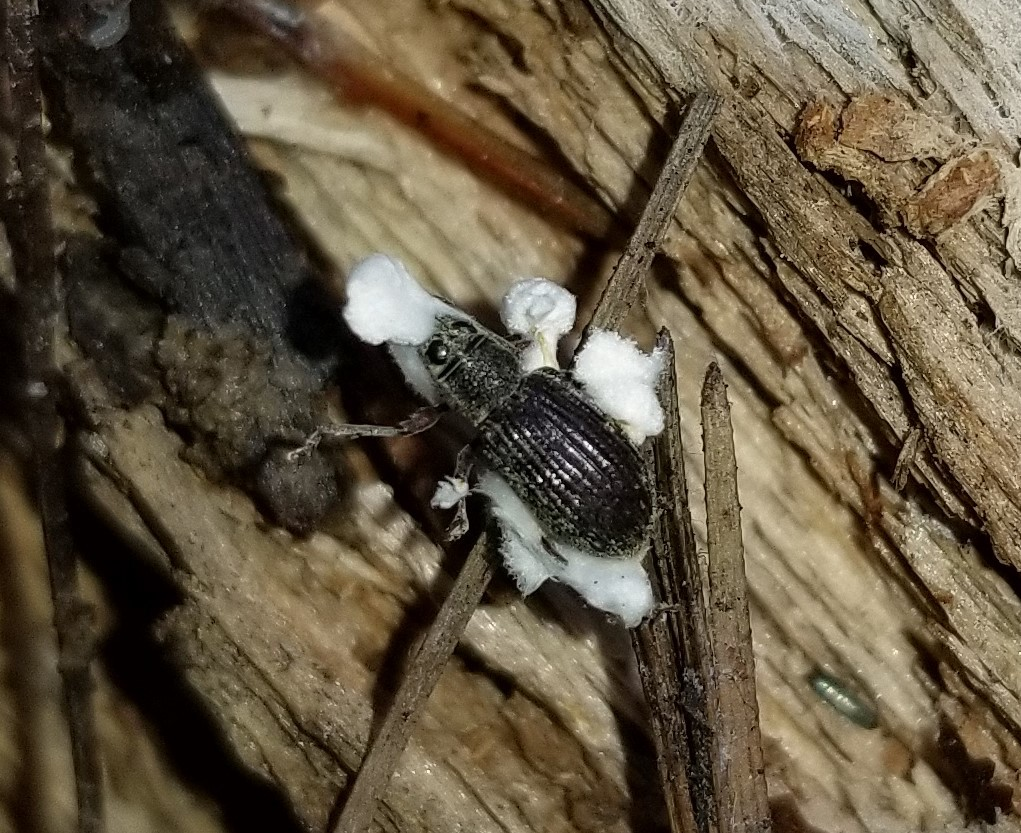

Scientific classification
- Kingdom: Fungi
- Division: Ascomycota
- Class: Sordariomycetes
- Order: Hypocreales
- Family: Cordycipitaceae
- Genus: Beauveria
- Species: B. brongniartii

Binomial name
- Beauveria brongniartii (Sacc.) Petch

Synonyms
- Synonymy: Beauveria melolonthae (Sacc.) Cif.; Beauveria tenella (Sacc.) D.M.Macleod; Beauveria tenella (Sacc.) Siemaszko; Botrytis bassiana subsp. tenella (Sacc.) Sacc.; Botrytis brongniartii Sacc.; Botrytis melolonthae Sacc.; Botrytis tenella (Sacc.) Delacr., 1891; Botrytis tenella Sacc.; Isaria kogane Haseg. & R.Koyama; Helianthus tubaeformis Isaria tenella (Sacc.) Giard

= Beauveria brongniartii =

Species of fungus

Beauveria brongniartii is a type of fungus belonging to the genus Beauveria.
