= Macowaniella =

Scientific classification
- Kingdom: Fungi
- Division: Ascomycota
- Class: Dothideomycetes
- Order: Asterinales
- Family: Asterinaceae
- Genus: Macowaniella; Doidge

Type species
- Macowaniella congesta (G. Winter) Doidge

Species
- Macowaniella congesta Macowaniella myrsinicola

Genus of fungi

Macowaniella is a genus of fungi in the Asterinaceae family. The relationship of this taxon to other taxa within the class is unknown (incertae sedis), and it has not yet been placed with certainty into any order.

It is mainly found in South Africa or Alaska.

The genus name of Macowaniella is in honour of Peter MacOwen (1830-1909), who was a (British-) South African teacher, chemist and botanist.

The genus was circumscribed by Ethel Mary Doidge in Bothalia vol.1 on page 9 in 1921.
