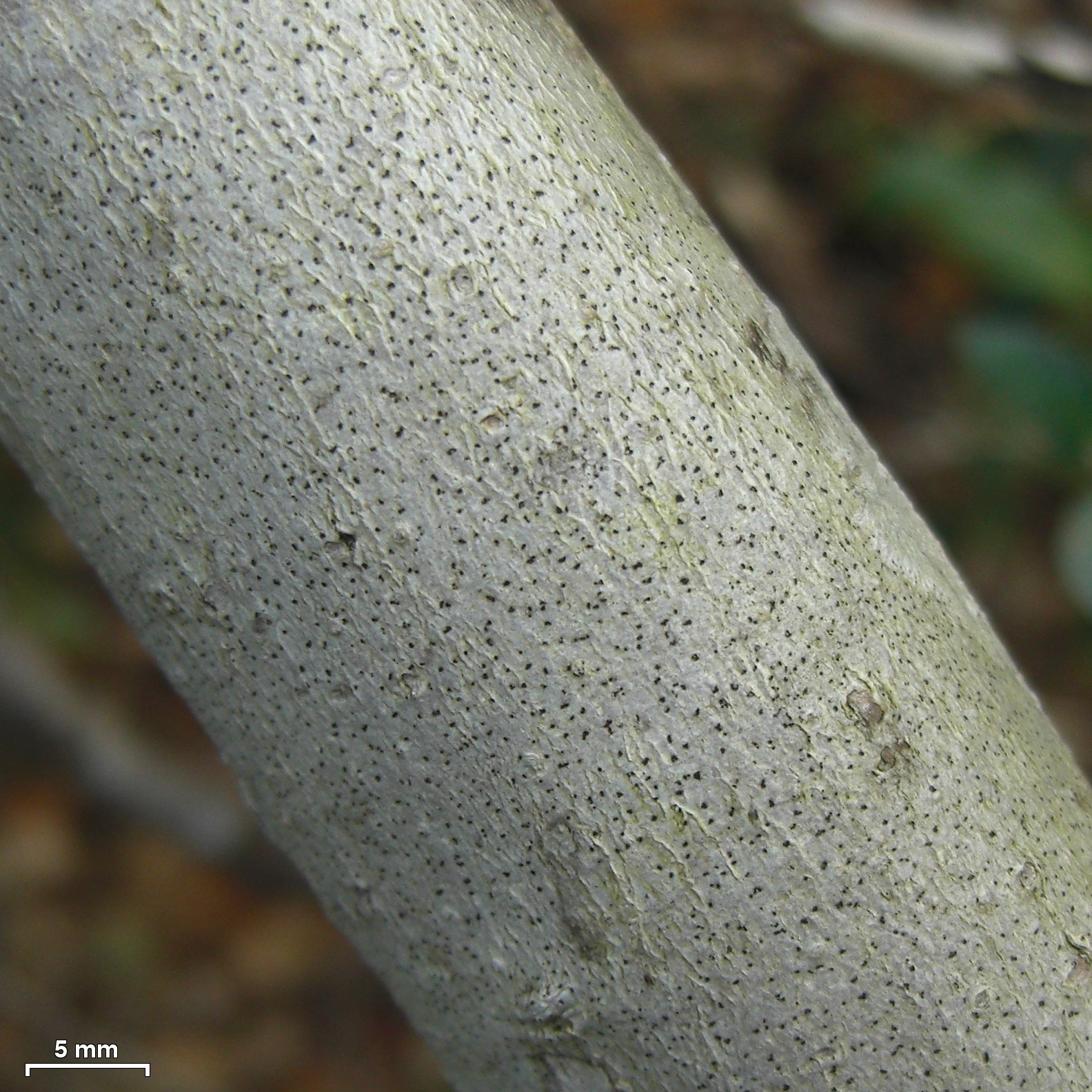
- Mycoporum eschweileri

Scientific classification
- Kingdom: Fungi
- Division: Ascomycota
- Class: Dothideomycetes
- Order: Pleosporales
- Family: Mycoporaceae
- Genus: Mycoporum; Flot. ex Nyl.

Synonyms
- Dictyothyrium W.B.Grove, 1932; Pseudomycoporon Marchand, 1896

= Mycoporum =

Genus of fungi

Mycoporum is a genus of fungi which belongs to the family Mycoporaceae, and has cosmopolitan distribution.

== Species ==
Species:

- Mycoporum acervatum R.C.Harris
- Mycoporum acharii Spreng.
- Mycoporum antecellens (Nyl.) R.C.Harris
