= Syspastospora parasitica =

Scientific classification
- Kingdom: Fungi
- Division: Ascomycota
- Class: Sordariomycetes
- Order: Coronophorales
- Family: Ceratostomataceae
- Genus: Syspastospora
- Species: S. parasitica

Binomial name
- Syspastospora parasitica (Tul.) P.F.Cannon & D. Hawksw. (1982)

Synonyms
- Sphaeronaema parasitica Tul. (1857); Melanospora parasitica (Tul.) Tul. & C.Tul. (1865)

Species of fungus

Syspastospora parasitica is a mycoparasitic fungus. It attacks other fungi, particularly species of Beauveria and Isaria (molds that belong to the family Clavicipitaceae). It parasitizes the mycelium of its host by means of specialized contact cells, and produces dark brown, long-necked perithecia.
