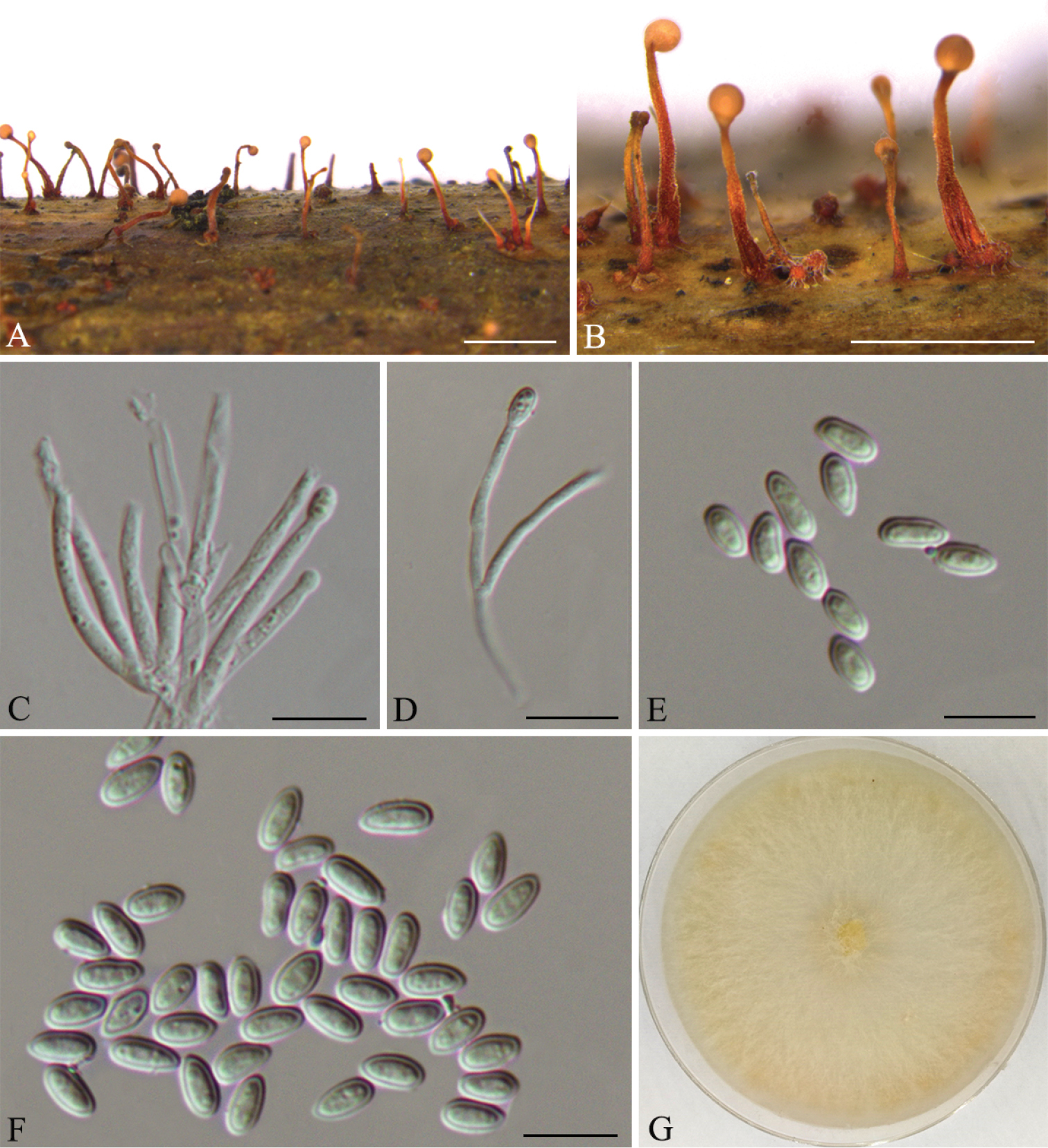

Scientific classification
- Kingdom: Fungi
- Division: Ascomycota
- Class: Sordariomycetes
- Order: Hypocreales
- Family: Nectriaceae
- Genus: Nectria
- Species: N. pseudotrichia

Binomial name
- Nectria pseudotrichia (Schwein.) Berk. & M.A. Curtis, (1853)

Synonyms
- Megalonectria pseudotrichia (Schwein.) Speg., An. Soc. cient. argent. 12(5): 216 (1881); Pleonectria pseudotrichia (Schwein.) Wollenw., Angew. Bot. 8: 195 (1926); Sphaeria pseudotrichia Schwein., (1832); Sphaerostilbe pseudotrichia (Schwein.) Berk. & Broome, (1873); Thyronectria pseudotrichia (Schwein.) Seeler,: 438 (1940)

= Nectria pseudotrichia =

Species of fungus

Nectria pseudotrichia is an ascomycete plant pathogen, of which the orange-coloured fruiting bodies are just visible to the naked eye.
