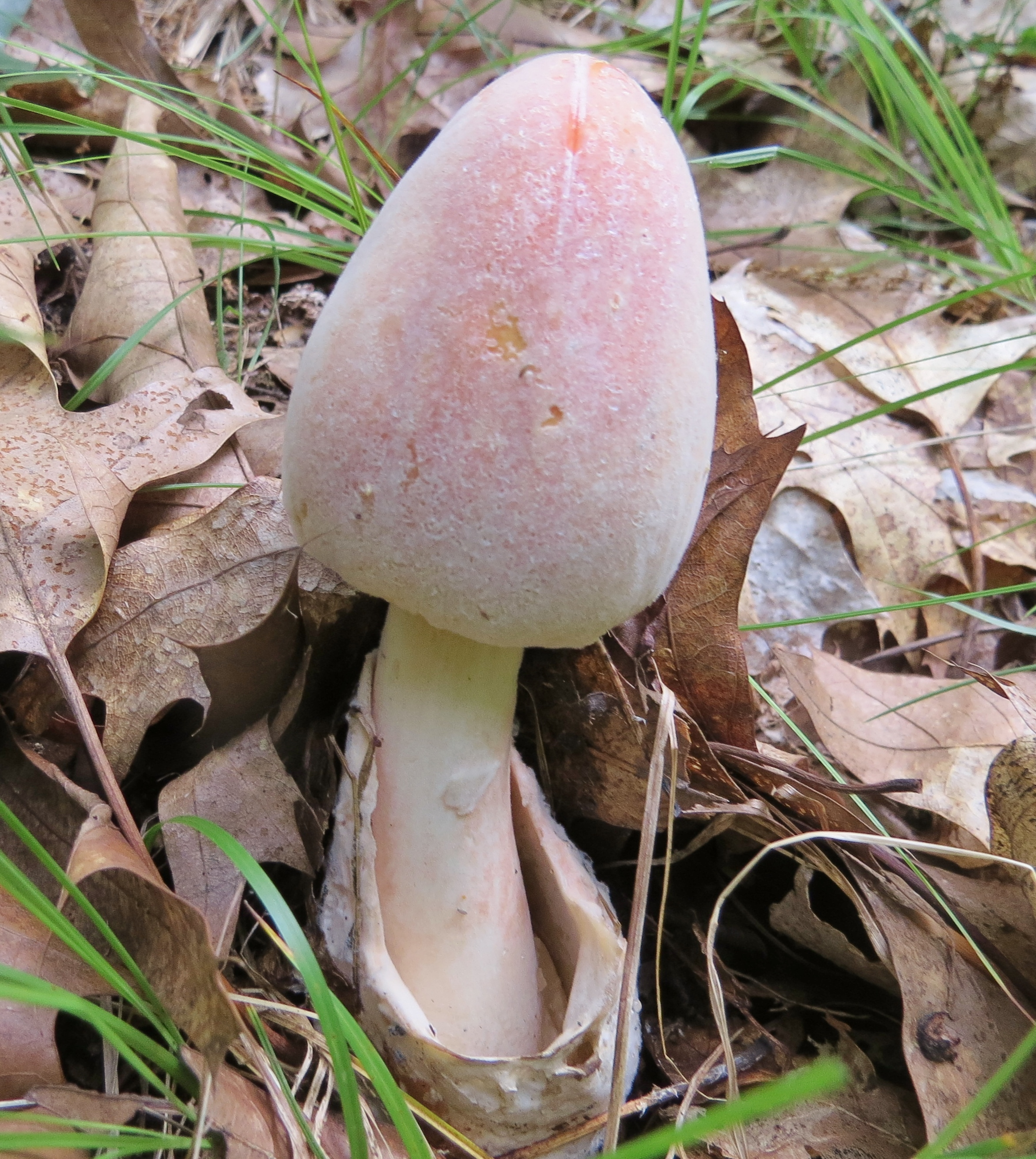
- Mycogone rosea infecting Amanita jacksonii

Scientific classification
- Kingdom: Fungi
- Division: Ascomycota
- Class: Sordariomycetes
- Order: Hypocreales
- Family: Hypocreaceae
- Genus: Mycogone; Link

Type species
- Mycogone rosea Link

= Mycogone =

Genus of fungi

Mycogone is a genus of fungi belonging to the family Hypocreaceae.

The genus has almost cosmopolitan distribution.

== Infection ==
Mycogone, such as the species Mycogone perniciosa (also known as wet bubble) is a fungal species that can infect mushrooms, forming a fluffy, white cloud of mycelium and forming a pungent odor. The presence of a high pathogenicity such as that of Mycogene can cause significant yield losses in the mushroom industry.

== Species ==
Species:

- Mycogone alba Pers.
- Mycogone anceps Sacc.
- Mycogone aurantiaca Sousa da Câmara
- Mycogone cervina Link
- Mycogone cinerea Morgan
