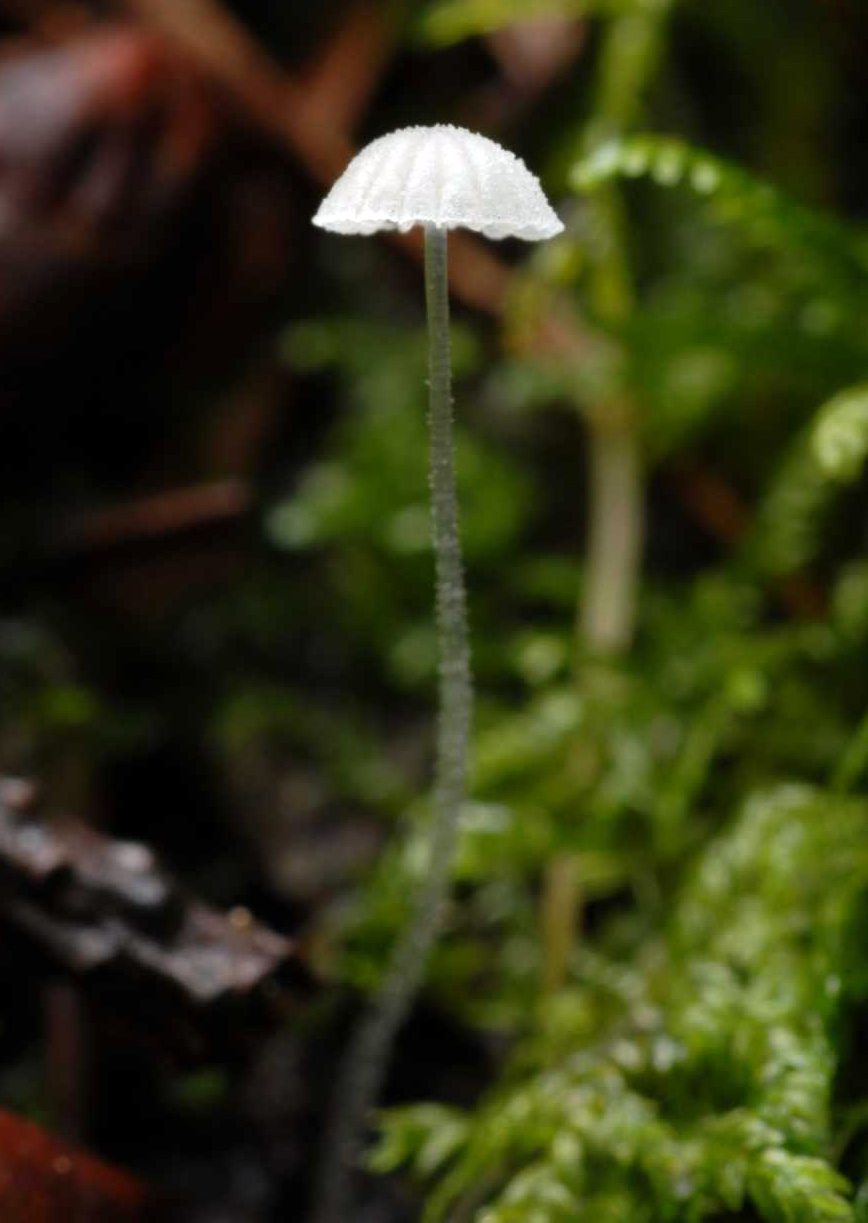

Scientific classification
- Kingdom: Fungi
- Division: Basidiomycota
- Class: Agaricomycetes
- Order: Agaricales
- Family: Mycenaceae
- Genus: Mycena
- Species: M. adscendens

Binomial name
- Mycena adscendens (Lasch) Maas Geest. (1981)

Synonyms
- Agaricus adscendens Lasch (1829); Agaricus tenerrimus Berk. (1836); Mycena tenerrima (Berk.) Sacc.; Mycena tenerrima (Fr.) Quél. (1874); Prunulus tenerrimus (Berk.) Murrill (1916); Pseudomycena tenerrima (Berk.) Cejp (1930)

= Mycena adscendens =

Species of fungus

Mycena adscendens Mycological characteristics
- Gills on hymenium
- Cap is conical
- Hymenium is free or adnexed
- Stipe is bare
- Spore print is white
- Ecology is saprotrophic
- Edibility is unknown

Mycena adscendens, commonly known as the frosty bonnet, is a species of fungus in the family Mycenaceae. The fungus produces small white fruit bodies (mushrooms) with caps up to 7.5 mm (0.3 in) in diameter that appear to be dusted with sugar-like granules. Caps are supported by thin, hollow stems up to 20 mm (0.8 in) long, which are set on a disc-like base. Its distribution includes Europe, Turkey and the Pacific coast of the United States. The fruit bodies grow on fallen twigs and other woody debris on the forest floor, including fallen hazel nuts. The variety carpophila is known from Japan. There are several small white Mycena species that are similar in appearance to M. adscendens, some of which can be reliably distinguished only by examining microscopic characteristics.

== Taxonomy ==
The species, originally named Agaricus adscendens by Wilhelm Gottfried Lasch in 1829, was first collected in the Province of Brandenburg, in what was then the Kingdom of Prussia (now Germany). It was Dutch mycologist Maas Geesteranus who assigned the species its current name in a 1981 publication. According to Maas Geesteranus, Miles Berkeley's 1836 Agaricus tenerrimus is the same species as Mycena adscendens, as well as all later synonyms based on this basionym: Mycena tenerrima, published by Lucien Quélet in 1872; Prunulus tenerrimus by William Alphonso Murrill in 1916; and Karel Cejp's 1930 Pseudomycena tenerrima. Although Index Fungorum agrees with Maas Geesteranus's synonymy, other authorities treat the species as independent. An additional synonym is Agaricus (Mycena) farinellus, described by Johann Feltgen from Luxembourg in 1906.

The variety M. adscendens var. carpophila, published by Dennis Desjardin in 1995, was originally proposed as M. tenerrima var. carpophila by Jakob Emanuel Lange in 1914.

Mycena adscendens is the type species of section Sacchariferae of the genus Mycena, which contains white species with floccose caps (covered with tufts of soft woolly hairs). Other members of this section include M. floccifera, M. discopus, and M. nucicola. The mushroom is commonly known as the "frosty bonnet". The specific epithet adscendens, derived from the Latin, means "ascending" or "curving up from a prostrate base". Tenerrima derives from the Latin tener, meaning "tender" or "delicate".

== Description ==
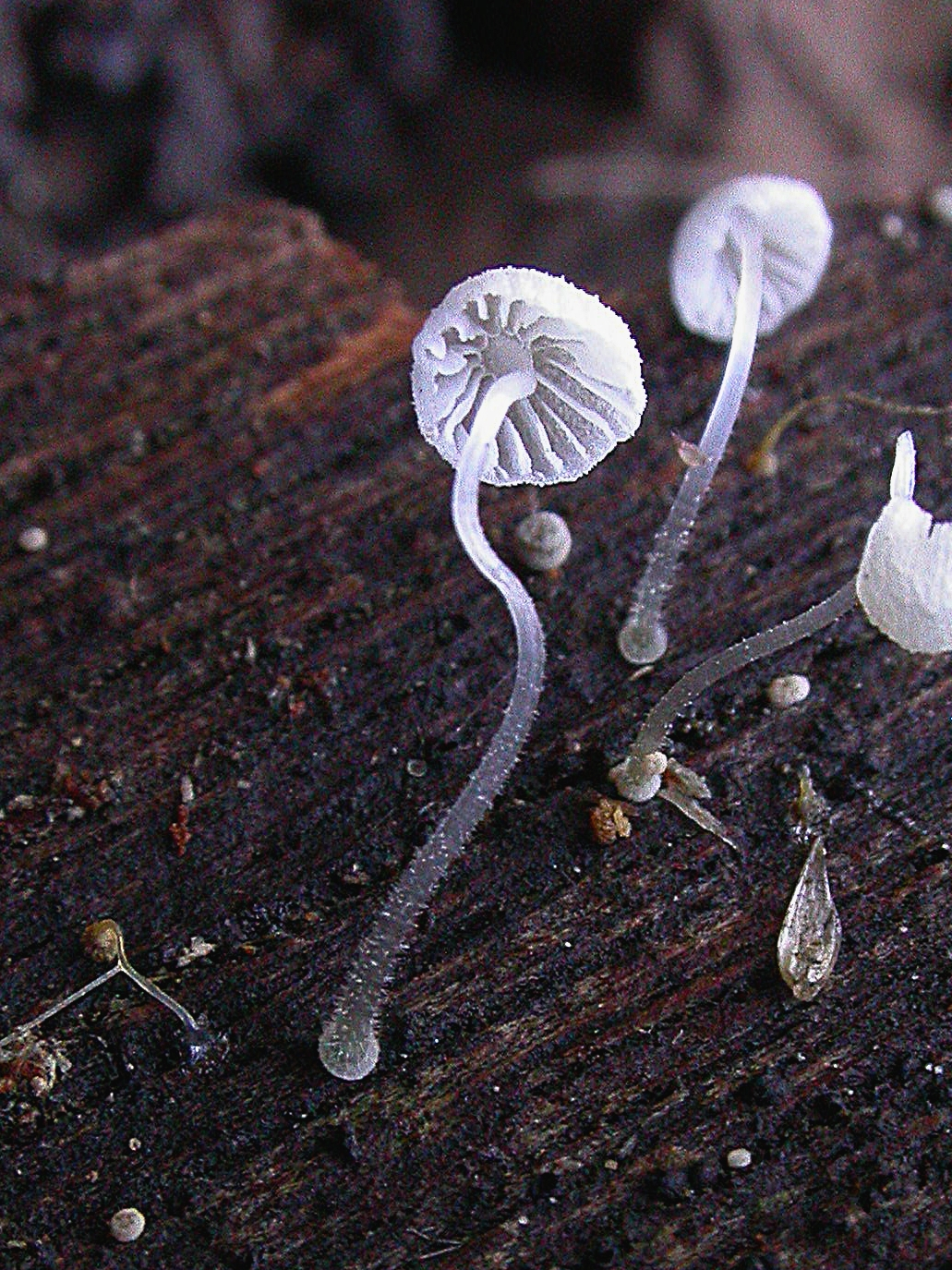
Gills are distantly spaced

The cap is white and small, with a diameter typically ranging from 2.5 to 7.5 mm (0.1 to 0.3 in). Initially convex to cucullate (hood-shaped), it flattens during maturity, developing visible surface grooves that correspond to the gills underneath the cap; the surface may also be covered with glistening particles, remnants of the partial veil. The cap is pallid gray with a whitish margin when young, but soon becomes white overall. The flesh is membranous, fragile, and thin (less than 0.5 mm). The gills are free from attachment or narrowly attached (adnexed) to the stem. They are up to 0.5 mm broad, distantly-spaced (usually numbering between 7 and 12), and sometimes adhering to each other to form a slight collar (a pseudocollarium) around the stem. They are translucent-white throughout their development, with a fringed, white edge. The hollow stem is 0.5 to 2 cm (0.2 to 0.8 in) long, and usually curved and threadlike. The bottom of the stem is enlarged into a slight bulb, which is initially nearly spherical. At the very base of the stem is a small, white, and hairy disk-like base that attaches to the substrate. The edibility of the mushroom is unknown, but like many small Mycenas, they are insubstantial and not likely to be considered for the table.

The variety carpophila is characterized by its tiny white cap up to 1 mm in diameter, and narrowly conical caulocystidia (cystidia found on the stem).

=== Microscopic characteristics ===
Mycena adscendens produces a white spore print. The spores are broadly ellipsoid, amyloid, and have dimensions of 8–10 by 5–6.5 μm. Basidia (spore-bearing cells) are two-spored, club-shaped, and measure 14–17 by 7–9 μm. Pleurocystidia (cystidia on the gill faces) may be present or absent. If present, they are similar to the cheilocystidia (cystidia on the gill edges). The cheilocystidia are abundant, measuring 28–44 by 8–12 μm. They are variable in shape, often fusoid-ventricose (fuse-shaped with a swollen center) or with 2–3 needle-like projections arising from the apex; the projections are sometimes forked. The swollen parts of the cheilocystidia are covered with short rodlike protuberances or warts. The flesh of the gills is vinaceous-brown when stained in iodine. The flesh of the cap is made up of greatly enlarged cells, with the surface covered with club-shaped to almost globular cells measuring 25–40 by about 20 μm. Their walls are finely verrucose (covered with small warts), and all but the verrucose cells are vinaceous-brown in iodine. Clamp connections are abundant in the hyphae.

=== Similar species ===
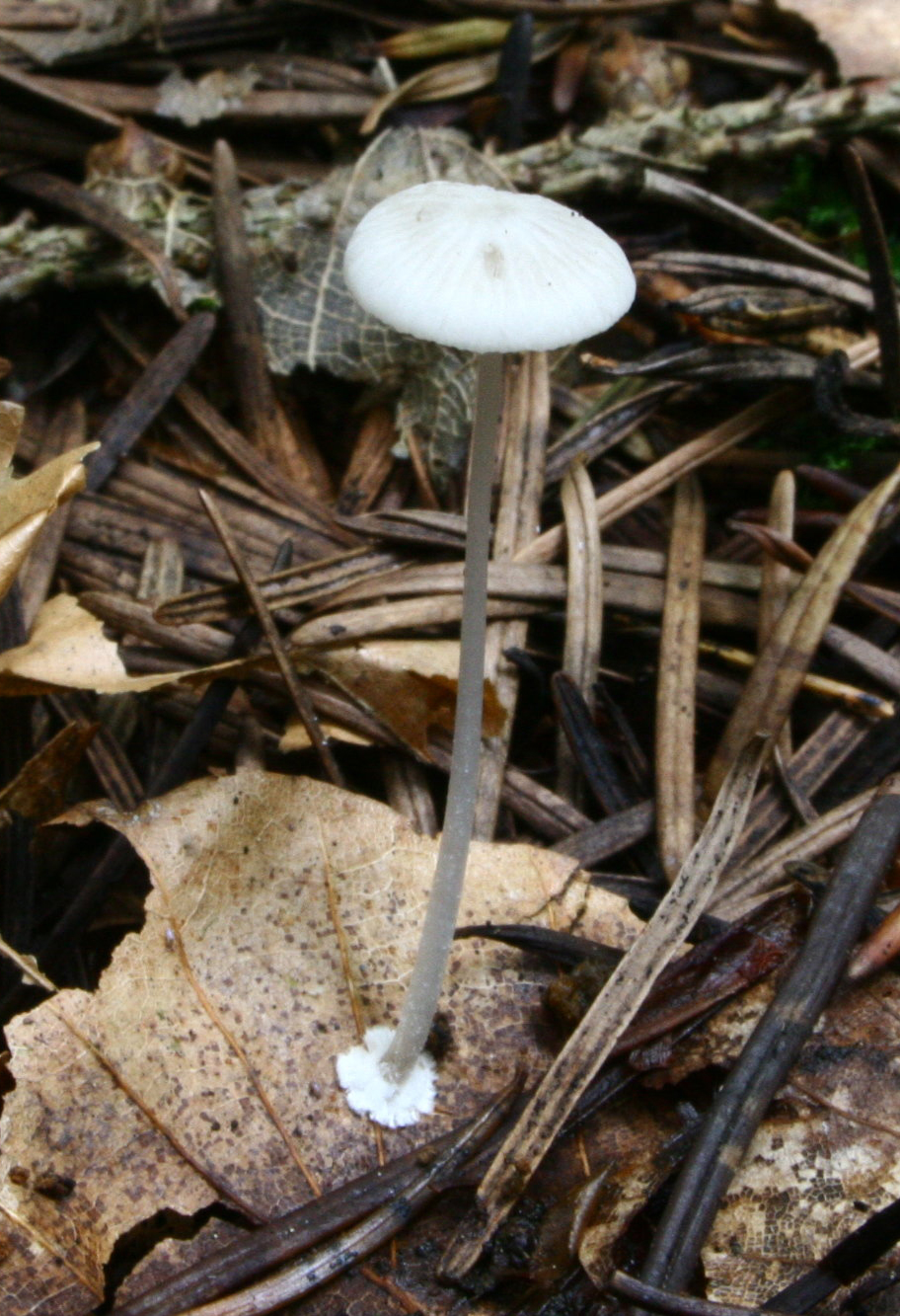
Mycena stylobates is a robust lookalike of M. adscendens.

Other Mycenas that resemble M. adscendens include M. alphitophora and M. stylobates. The former is distinguished from M. adscendens by a stem base that is not swollen or disc-like, the latter by its larger and sturdier fruit body and lack of granules on the cap. A poorly known Japanese species, M. cryptomeriicola, is similar to M. adscendens, but has non-amyloid spores and lacks clamps. M. nucicola is most reliably distinguished from M. adscendens by microscopic characteristics: M. nucicola has four-spored basidia, clamp connections are rare in the hyphae of the gill tissue, and the spores are less broad (typically 4.2–5 μm). The Finnish species M. occulta grows on the decaying needles of Norway spruce and Scots pine. It differs from M. adscendens in that its gills do not form a pseudocollarium, it lacks clamps in the hyphae and cells of the hymenium, and the terminal cells in its cap cuticle are densely covered with protuberances.

== Habitat and distribution ==
Fruit bodies of Mycena adscendens are found scattered to grouped together in twos or threes on fallen twigs, bark, and woody debris of hardwoods during the spring and autumn; it fruits less frequently on the wood of conifers. Fruitings are most common after periods of wet weather. They are also found growing on hazel nuts that have fallen to the ground; two other Mycenas known to grow on this substrate include M. discopus and M. nucicola. In the United States, it is known from Washington to California. It is also found in Europe, and has been collected in Amasya Province, Turkey. The variety carpophila, originally described from Denmark, was reported from Japan in 2003.
