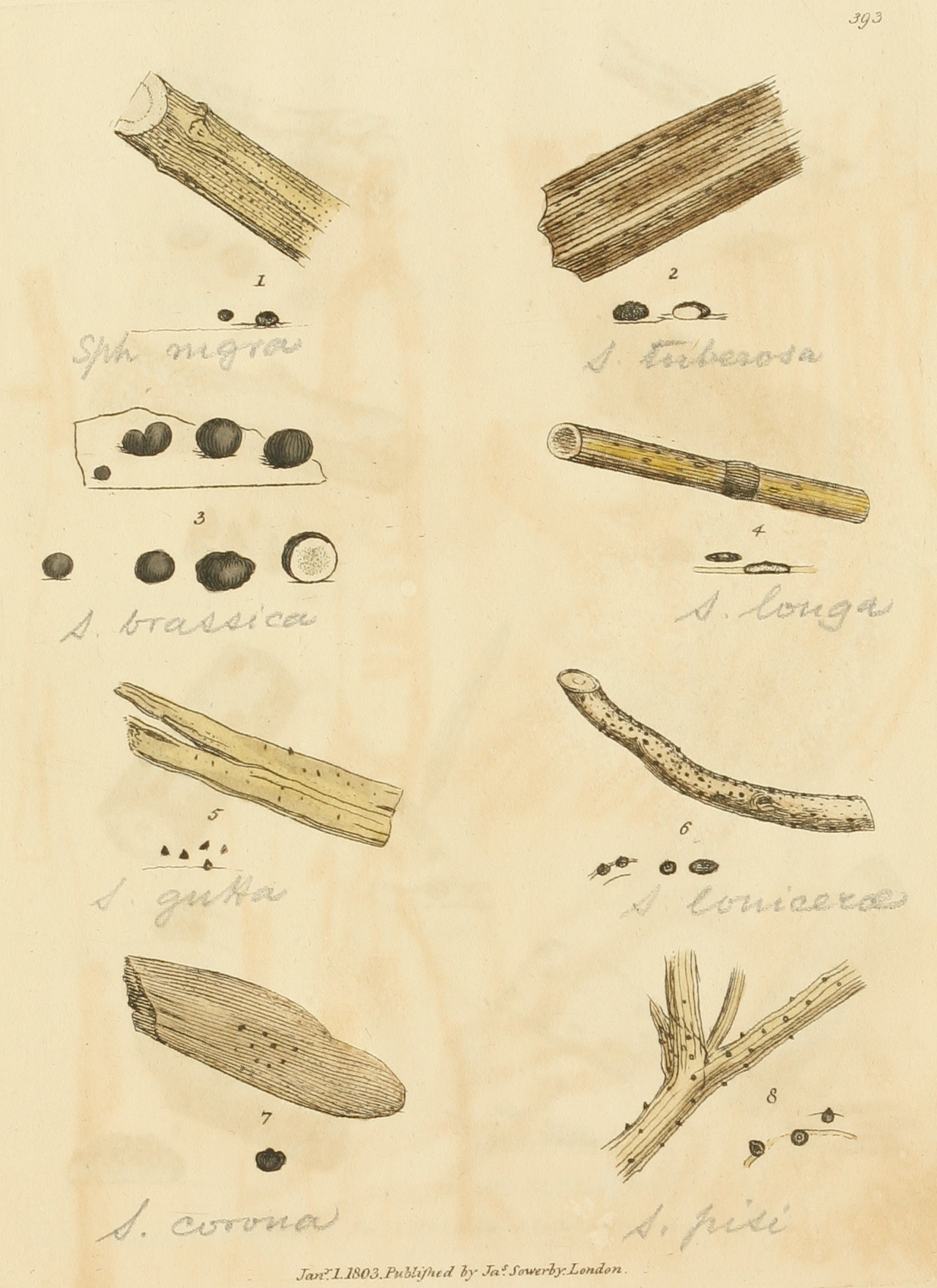
- 7. Melanopsamma pomiformis

Scientific classification
- Kingdom: Fungi
- Division: Ascomycota
- Class: Sordariomycetes
- Order: Hypocreales
- Family: Niessliaceae
- Genus: Melanopsamma; Niessl (1876)

Type species
- Melanopsamma pomiformis (Pers.) Sacc. (1878)

= Melanopsamma =

Genus of fungi

Melanopsamma is a genus of fungi within the Niessliaceae family. The genus contains 41 species.

== Species ==
- Melanopsamma abscondita
- Melanopsamma aggregata
- Melanopsamma alpina
- Melanopsamma amphisphaeria
- Melanopsamma ampulligera
- Melanopsamma anaxaea
- Melanopsamma andina
- Melanopsamma areolata
- Melanopsamma australis
- Melanopsamma balani
- Melanopsamma balnei-ursi
- Melanopsamma berberidis
- Melanopsamma bolleana
- Melanopsamma borealis
- Melanopsamma buxiformis
- Melanopsamma caespitula
- Melanopsamma caraganae
- Melanopsamma carpatica
- Melanopsamma caulincola
- Melanopsamma chilensis
- Melanopsamma coffeicola
- Melanopsamma confertissima
- Melanopsamma congesta
- Melanopsamma conospora
- Melanopsamma cordobensis
- Melanopsamma cormophila
- Melanopsamma corticola
- Melanopsamma cryptostoma
- Melanopsamma cubigena
- Melanopsamma cupressina
- Melanopsamma cylindrospora
- Melanopsamma depressa
- Melanopsamma diana
- Melanopsamma ellisii
- Melanopsamma emergens
- Melanopsamma emersa
- Melanopsamma europaea
- Melanopsamma fallax
- Melanopsamma glandis
- Melanopsamma graopsis
- Melanopsamma herpotrichoides
- Melanopsamma hyalodidyma
- Melanopsamma hydrotheca
- Melanopsamma hypophoea
- Melanopsamma hypoxyloides
- Melanopsamma improvisa
- Melanopsamma incrustans
- Melanopsamma indica
- Melanopsamma interlamellaris
- Melanopsamma jaapiana
- Melanopsamma kansensis
- Melanopsamma lanuginosa
- Melanopsamma latericollis
- Melanopsamma laurincola
- Melanopsamma lettauiana
- Melanopsamma lichenoides
- Melanopsamma lophiostomoides
- Melanopsamma martianoffiana
- Melanopsamma melanostigma
- Melanopsamma mendax
- Melanopsamma merrillii
- Melanopsamma minima
- Melanopsamma moravica
- Melanopsamma nipicola
- Melanopsamma nitens
- Melanopsamma nitida
- Melanopsamma nucigena
- Melanopsamma numerosa
- Melanopsamma obtusa
- Melanopsamma obtusella
- Melanopsamma ossicola
- Melanopsamma papilla
- Melanopsamma parasitica
- Melanopsamma patellata
- Melanopsamma petrucciana
- Melanopsamma phloeophytenta
- Melanopsamma pomiformis
- Melanopsamma pustula
- Melanopsamma radicis
- Melanopsamma ranjanii
- Melanopsamma recessa
- Melanopsamma ribis
- Melanopsamma romelliana
- Melanopsamma rosae
- Melanopsamma saccardoana
- Melanopsamma salicaria
- Melanopsamma salicina
- Melanopsamma salviae
- Melanopsamma saxauli
- Melanopsamma schizostomoides
- Melanopsamma siemoniana
- Melanopsamma sphaerelloides
- Melanopsamma sphaeroidea
- Melanopsamma subfasciculata
- Melanopsamma subrhombispora
- Melanopsamma suecica
- Melanopsamma syringica
- Melanopsamma tenerrima
- Melanopsamma texensis
- Melanopsamma umbratilis
- Melanopsamma utahensis
- Melanopsamma valdiviensis
- Melanopsamma verrucosa
- Melanopsamma waghornei
- Melanopsamma yerbae
