= Acrodontium simplex =

Scientific classification
- Kingdom: Fungi
- Division: Ascomycota
- Class: Dothideomycetes
- Order: Mycosphaerellales
- Family: Teratosphaeriaceae
- Genus: Acrodontium
- Species: A. simplex

Binomial name
- Acrodontium simplex (F.Mangenot) de Hoog (1972)

Synonyms
- Beauveria simplex F.Mangenot (1952)

Species of fungus

Acrodontium simplex is an ascomycete fungus that is a plant pathogen. It can cause leaf speckle in bananas which causes the leaves to turn brown and die.
