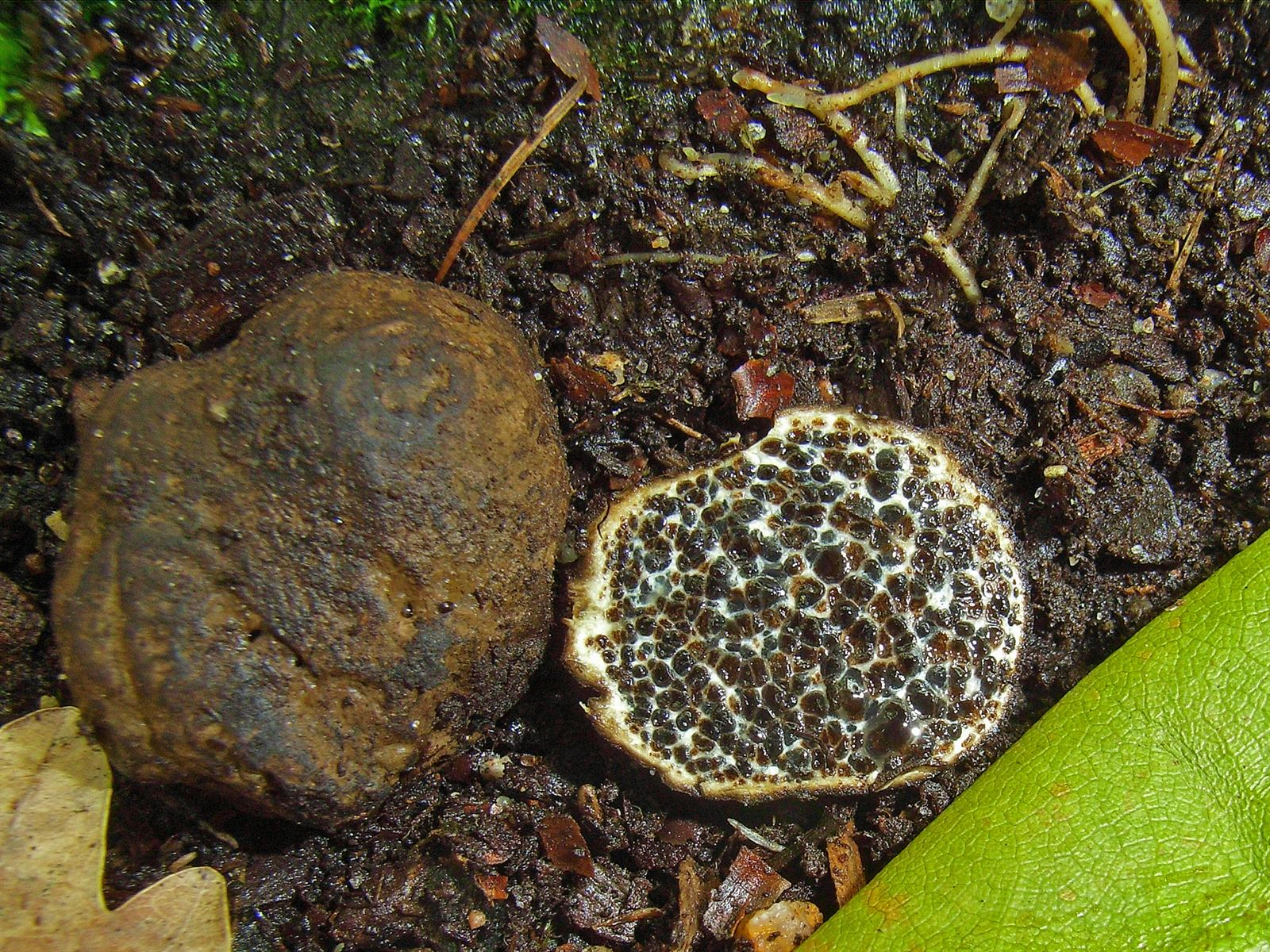

Scientific classification
- Kingdom: Fungi
- Division: Basidiomycota
- Class: Agaricomycetes
- Order: Boletales
- Family: Paxillaceae
- Genus: Melanogaster
- Species: M. ambiguus

Binomial name
- Melanogaster ambiguus (Vittad.) Tul. & C. Tul.

Synonyms
- Octaviania ambigua Vittad.; Melanogaster ambiguus var. ambiguus; Argylium liquaminosum Wallr.; Melanogaster klotzschii Corda

= Melanogaster ambiguus =

Species of fungus

Melanogaster ambiguus is a species of fungus in the family Paxillaceae, first described by Carlo Vittadini and given its current name by Edmond Tulasne and Charles Tulasne.

== Distribution and habitat ==
It appears in North America, Oceania and Europe. It grows in deciduous and mixed forests, arboreta, under fir trees and hornbeams.
