= Metasphaeria =

Scientific classification
- Domain: Eukaryota
- Kingdom: Fungi
- Division: Ascomycota
- Class: Dothideomycetes
- Order: Dothideales
- Family: Saccotheciaceae
- Genus: Metasphaeria; Saccardo, 1883

Genus of fungi

Metasphaeria is a genus of ascomycete fungi belonging to the family Saccotheciaceae.

The genus has cosmopolitan distribution.

== Species ==
Species:

- Metasphaeria abuensis Panwar & S.J.Kaur
- Metasphaeria abundans Rehm
- Metasphaeria acanthopanacis Kirschst.
