= Effects of cannabis =

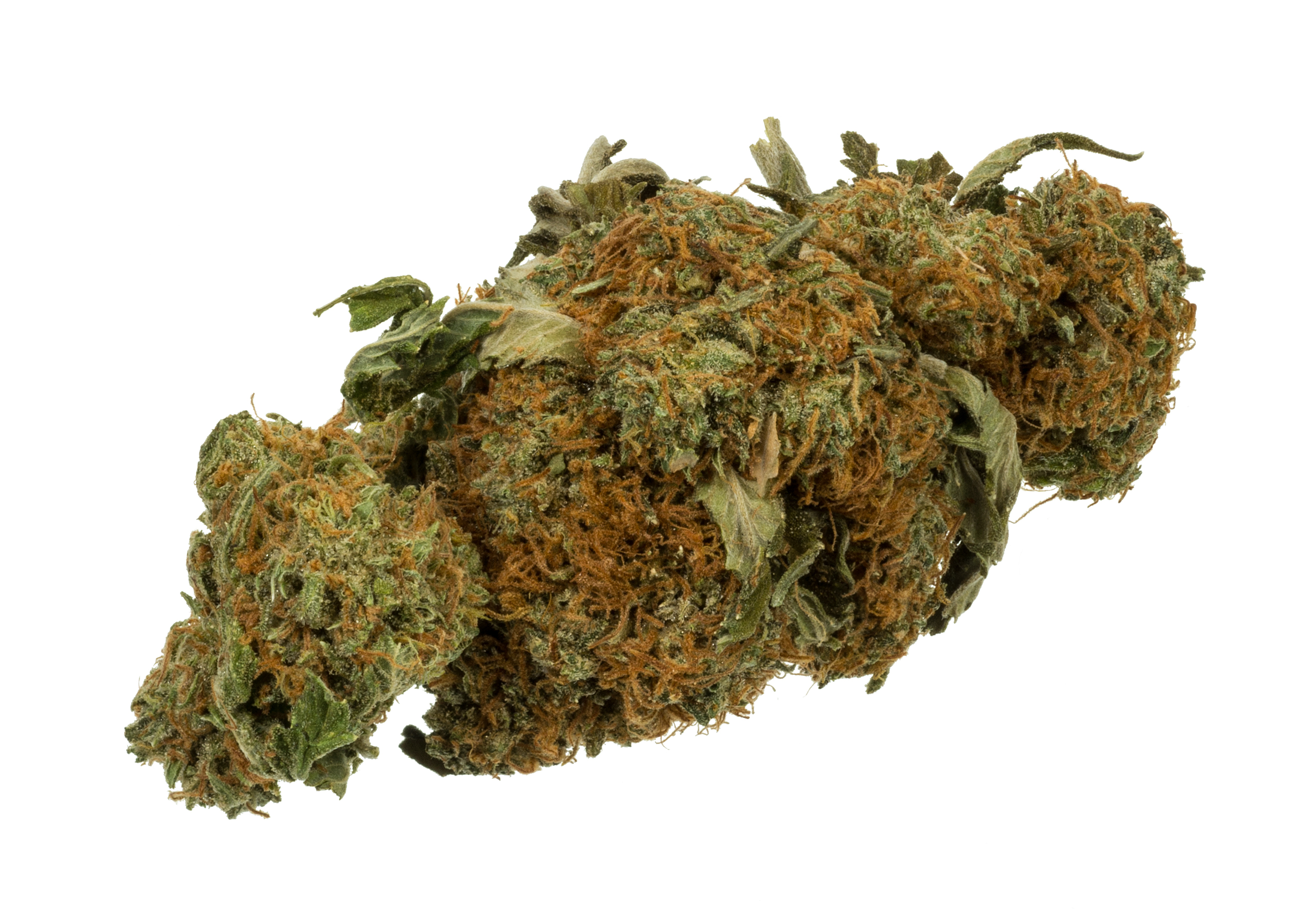
A dried cannabis flower

The short-term effects of cannabis are caused by many chemical compounds in the cannabis plant, including 113 different cannabinoids, such as tetrahydrocannabinol, and 120 terpenes, which allow its drug to have various psychological and physiological effects on the human body. Different plants of the genus Cannabis contain different and often unpredictable concentrations of THC and other cannabinoids and hundreds of other molecules that have a pharmacological effect, so the final net effect cannot reliably be foreseen.

Acute effects while under the influence can sometimes include euphoria or anxiety.

== Background and chronic use ==
In the United States, medical cannabis research is limited by federal restrictions.

Cannabis use disorder is defined as a medical diagnosis in the fifth revision of the Diagnostic and Statistical Manual of Mental Disorders (DSM-5).

== Chemistry ==
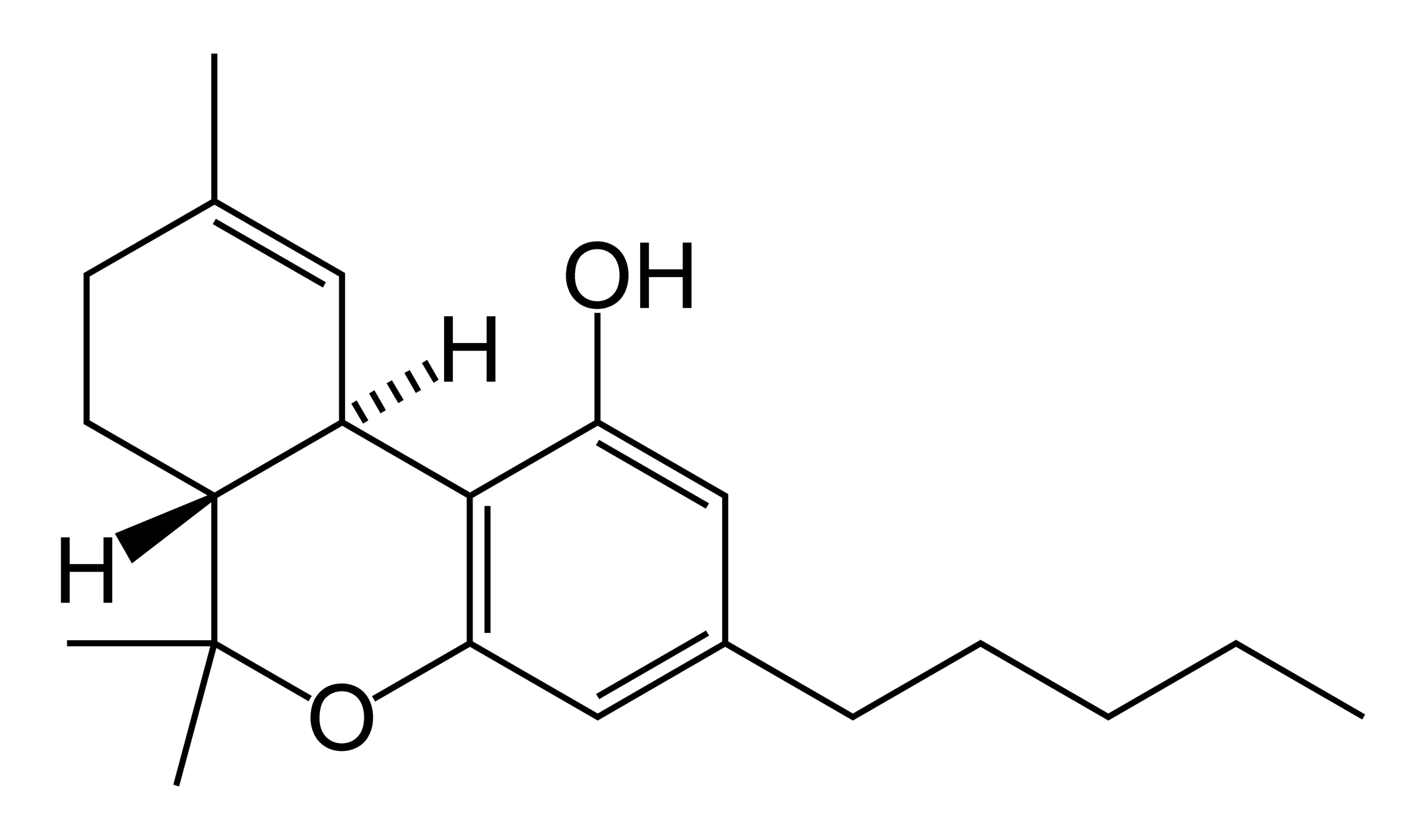
The structural formula of tetrahydrocannabinol

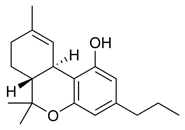
Tetrahydrocannabivarin

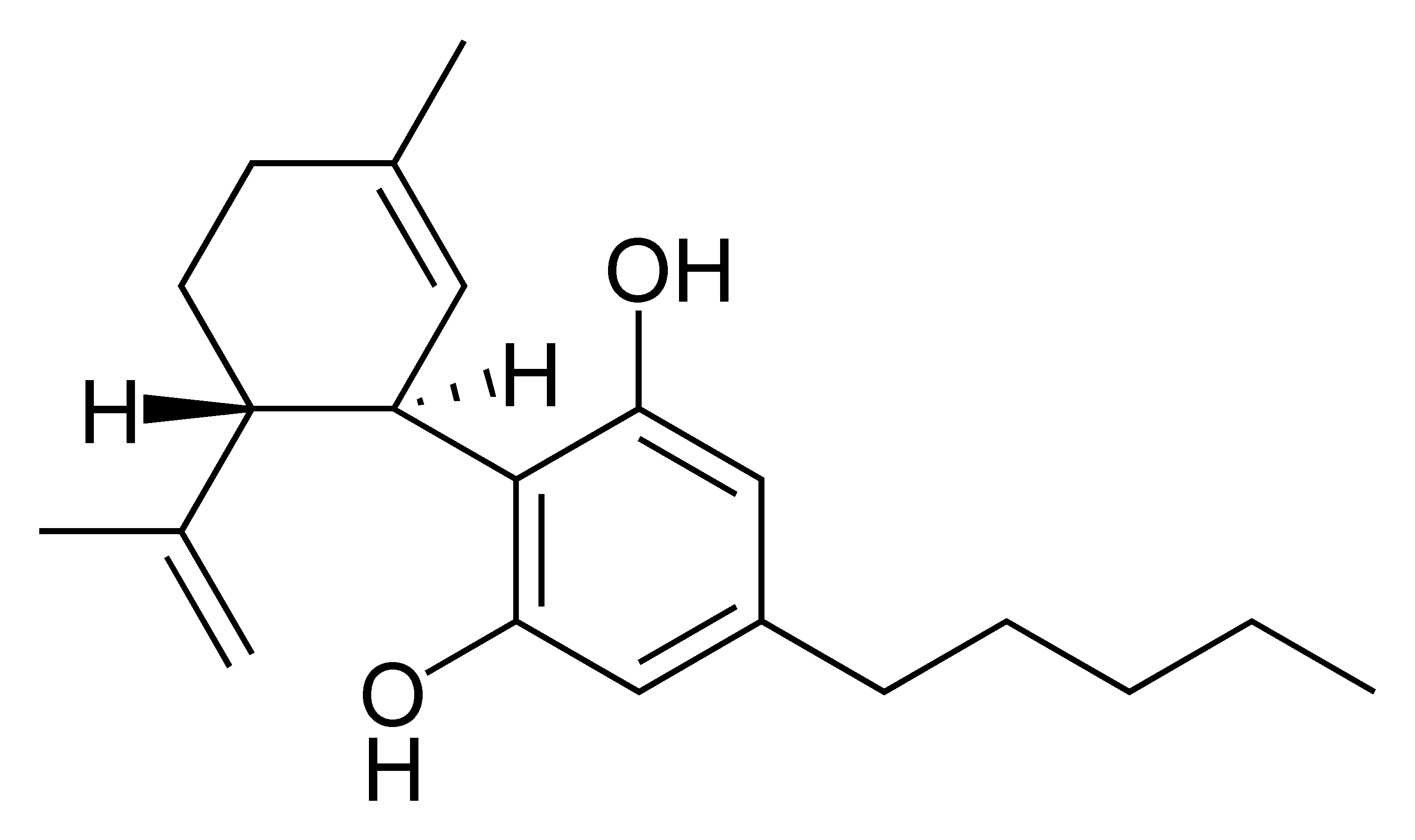
Cannabidiol

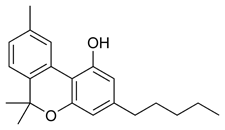
Cannabinol

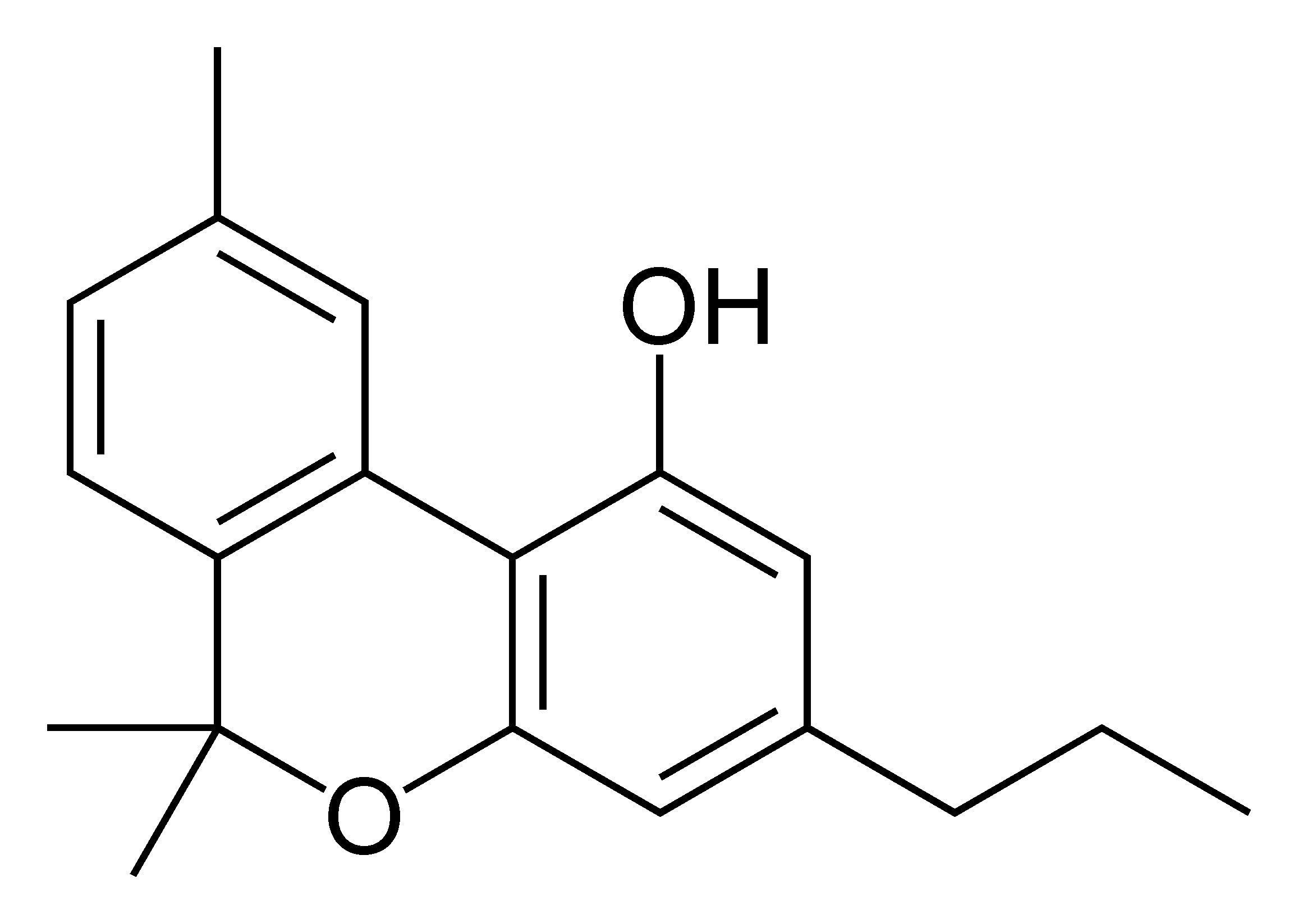
Cannabivarin

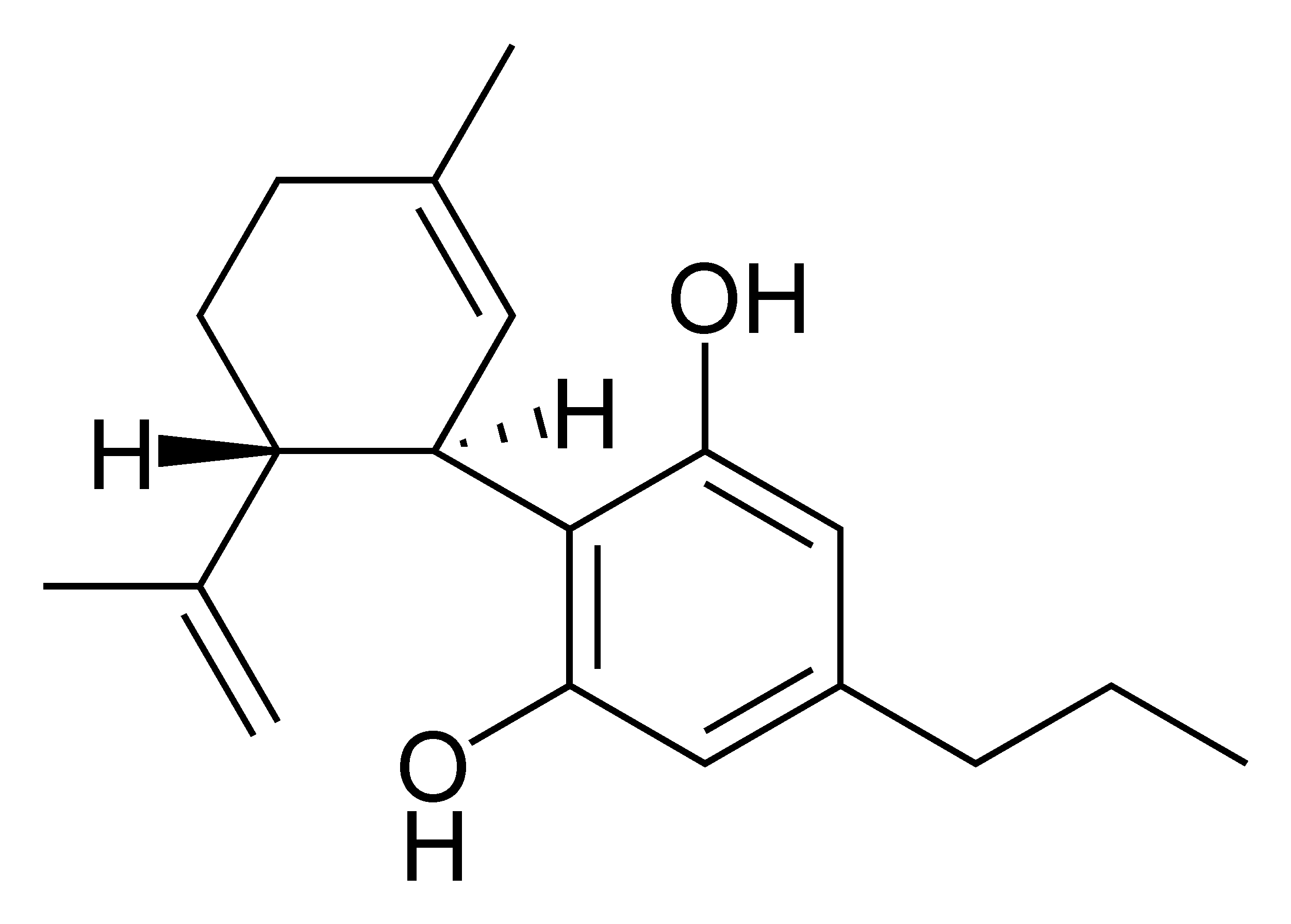
Cannabidivarin

=== Cannabinoids and cannabinoid receptors ===
The most prevalent psychoactive substances in cannabis are cannabinoids, particularly THC. Some varieties, having undergone careful selection and growing techniques, can yield as much as 34% THC. Another psychoactive cannabinoid present in Cannabis sativa is tetrahydrocannabivarin (THCV), but it is found in only small amounts and is a cannabinoid antagonist.

There are similar compounds in cannabis that do not exhibit psychoactive response but are obligatory for functionality: cannabidiol (CBD), an isomer of THC; cannabivarin (CBV), an analog of cannabinol (CBN) with a different side chain, cannabidivarin (CBDV), an analog of CBD with a different side chain, and cannabinolic acid. CBD is believed to regulate the metabolism of THC by inactivating cytochrome P450 enzymes that metabolize drugs; one such mechanism is via generation of carbon monoxide (a pharmacologically active neurotransmitter) upon metabolism of CBD. THC is converted rapidly to 11-hydroxy-THC, which is also pharmacologically active, so the euphoria outlasts measurable THC levels in blood.

=== Biochemical mechanisms in the brain ===
Cannabinoids usually contain a 1,1'-di-methyl-pyran ring, a variedly derivatized aromatic ring and a variedly unsaturated cyclohexyl ring and their immediate chemical precursors, constituting a family of about 60 bi-cyclic and tri-cyclic compounds. Like most other neurological processes, the effects of cannabis on the brain follow the standard protocol of signal transduction, the electrochemical system of sending signals through neurons for a biological response. It is now understood that cannabinoid receptors appear in similar forms in most vertebrates and invertebrates and have a long evolutionary history of 500 million years. The binding of cannabinoids to cannabinoid receptors decreases adenylyl cyclase activity, inhibits calcium N channels, and disinhibits K^{+}_{A} channels. There are at least two types of cannabinoid receptors (CB1 and CB2).

=== Sustainability in the body ===
Most cannabinoids are lipophilic (fat soluble) compounds that are easily stored in fat, thus yielding a long elimination half-life relative to other recreational drugs. The THC molecule, and related compounds, are usually detectable in drug tests from 3 days up to 10 days. Long-term users can produce positive tests for two to three months after ceasing cannabis use (see drug test).

== Toxicities ==
When cannabis is smoked, blood levels of THC peak rapidly after a few minutes and then decline, although the psychotropic effects persist for longer. Edible forms of cannabis often contain tens to hundreds of milligrams of THC, much more than the 32 mg of a typical cannabis cigarette. The rise of edible cannabis products has been responsible for a large increase of poisoning of children and young people. Symptoms in children can include lethargy, sedation and seizure.

Synthetic cannabis is suspected of being a potential contributory factor or direct cause of sudden death, due to the strain it can place on the cardiovascular system, or because of cannabinoid hyperemesis syndrome.

=== Related to cannabinoids ===
THC, the principal psychoactive constituent of the cannabis plant, has an extremely low toxicity and the amount that can enter the body through the consumption of cannabis plants poses no threat of death. In dogs, the minimum lethal dose of THC is over 3000 mg/kg. According to The Merck Index, the LD_{50} of THC (the dose which causes the death of 50% of individuals) is 1270 mg/kg for male rats and 730 mg/kg for female rats from oral consumption in sesame oil, and 42 mg/kg for rats from inhalation.

Cannabinoids and other molecules present in cannabis can alter the metabolism of other drugs, especially due to competition for clearing metabolic pathways such as cytochromes CYP450, thus leading to drug toxicities by medications that the person consuming cannabis may be taking.

=== Related to smoking ===
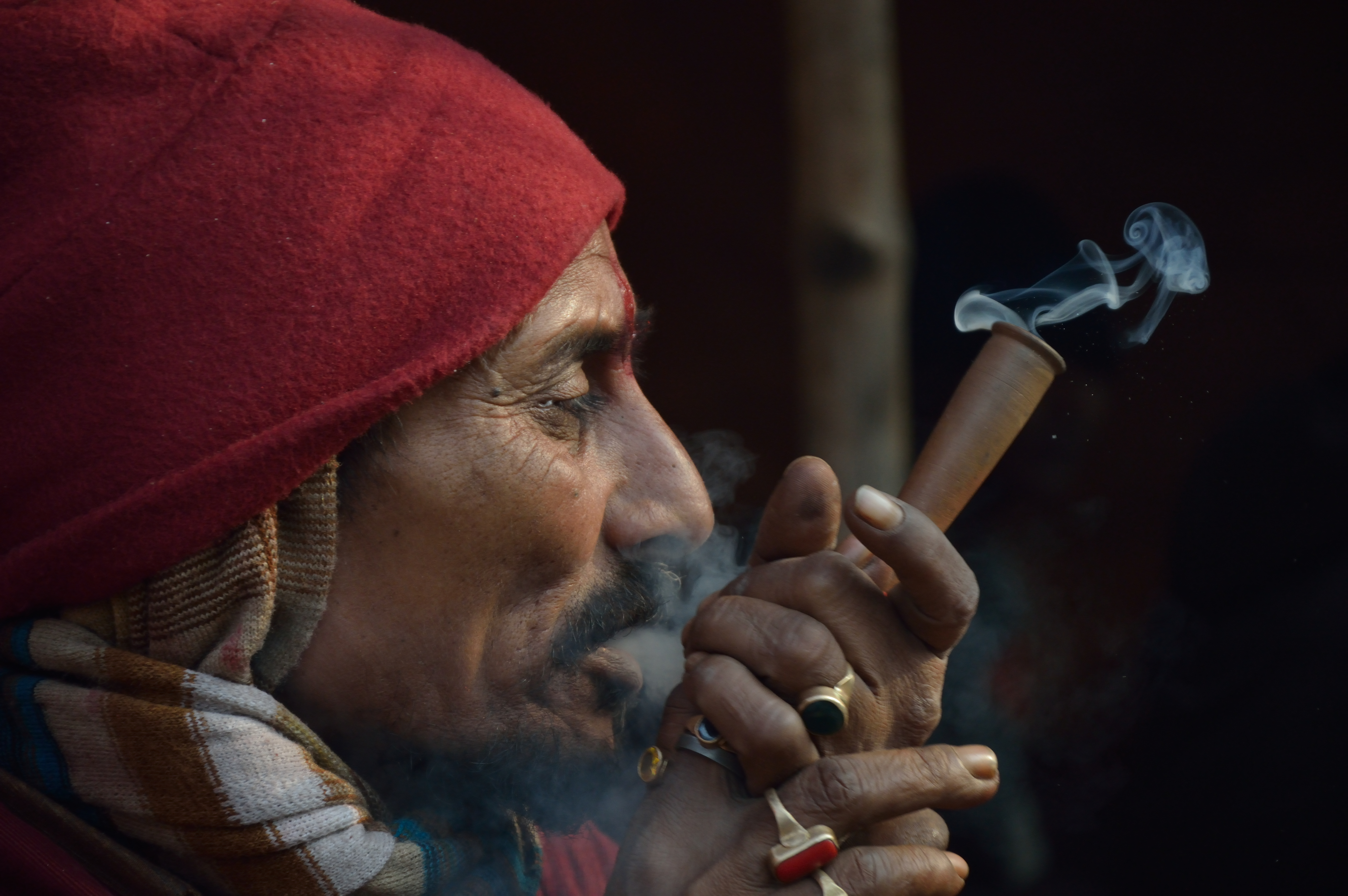
A man smoking cannabis in Kolkata, India

As of 2025, no high-quality evidence has been found linking cannabis smoking to lung cancer, despite cannabis smoke's having similar properties to tobacco smoke. Why this is the case remains unclear. Various studies have speculated that differences in patterns of use compared to tobacco could account for the difference, as well as the anti-inflammatory properties of certain cannabinoids. The health effects of cannabis smoke are an area of active study.

A 2007 study found that while tobacco and cannabis smoke are quite similar, cannabis smoke contained higher amounts of ammonia, hydrogen cyanide, and nitrogen oxides, but lower levels of carcinogenic polycyclic aromatic hydrocarbons (PAHs). This study found that directly inhaled cannabis smoke contained as much as 20 times as much ammonia and 5 times as much hydrogen cyanide as tobacco smoke and compared the properties of both mainstream and sidestream (smoke emitted from a smouldering 'joint' or 'cone') smoke. Mainstream cannabis smoke was found to contain higher concentrations of selected polycyclic aromatic hydrocarbons (PAHs) than sidestream tobacco smoke. However, other studies have found much lower disparities in ammonia and hydrogen cyanide between cannabis and tobacco, and that some other constituents (such as polonium-210, lead, arsenic, nicotine, and tobacco-specific nitrosamines) are either lower or non-existent in cannabis smoke. A 2021 longitudinal study conducted among populations of HIV-positive and HIV-negative adults found that smoke-related carcinogenic toxicants and biomarkers detected in tobacco smokers were also detected in exclusive cannabis smokers, including carbon monoxide (CO), polycyclic aromatic hydrocarbons (PAHs), aldehydes (such as acrolein), acrylonitrile and acrylamide metabolites, but exposures are lower compared with tobacco or dual smokers. Increased levels of acrolein exposure by tobacco smoking but not exclusive cannabis smoking were detected both in HIV-positive and HIV-negative adults, and contribute to increased diagnoses of cardiovascular diseases and respiratory diseases among tobacco smokers.

Cannabis smoke contains thousands of organic and inorganic chemical compounds. This tar is chemically similar to that found in tobacco smoke or cigars. Over fifty known carcinogens have been identified in cannabis smoke. These include nitrosamines, reactive aldehydes, and polycylic hydrocarbons, including benz[a]pyrene. Cannabis smoke was listed as a cancer agent in California in 2009. A study by the British Lung Foundation published in 2012 identifies cannabis smoke as a carcinogen and also finds awareness of the danger is low compared with the high awareness of the dangers of smoking tobacco particularly among younger users. Other observations include possible increased risk from each cigarette; lack of research on the effect of cannabis smoke alone; low rate of addiction compared to tobacco; and the episodic nature of cannabis use compared to steady, frequent smoking of tobacco. Professor David Nutt, a UK drug expert, points out that the study cited by the British Lung Foundation has been accused of both "false reasoning" and "incorrect methodology". Further, he notes that other studies have failed to connect cannabis with lung cancer, and accuses the BLF of "scaremongering over cannabis".

=== Related to vaping ===
In 2019 and 2020, severe lung illness from unregulated vapes was strongly linked to vitamin E acetate by the United States Centers for Disease Control and Prevention.

A common chemical found in e-cigarettes is ketene. When it enters the lungs after being inhaled, this chemical causes damage to the cellular structure of lung tissue causing the cells to not function at maximum capacity and not absorb gasses as readily. This can cause shortness of breath which can lead to other health conditions such as tachycardia and respiratory failure.

== Short-term effects ==
Difference between natural cannabinoids and THC: 1. THC; 2. CB-1 receptor; 3. Neurotransmitters; 4. Postsynaptic Receptors; 5. Cannabinoid

=== Onset and duration ===
When smoked, the short-term effects of cannabis manifest within seconds and are fully apparent within a few minutes, typically lasting 1–3 hours, varying by the person and the strain of cannabis. With oral ingestion, however, the onset of effect is delayed, taking 30 minutes to 2 hours, but the duration is prolonged due to continued slow absorption. The duration of noticeable effects has been observed to diminish after prolonged, repeated use, leading to the development of increased tolerance to cannabinoids.

=== Psychological effects ===
The psychoactive effects of cannabis, known as a "high", or being "stoned", etc., are subjective and vary among persons and the method of use.

When THC enters the blood stream and reaches the brain, it binds to cannabinoid receptors. The endogenous ligand of these receptors is anandamide, the effects of which THC emulates. This agonism of the cannabinoid receptors results in changes in the levels of various neurotransmitters, especially dopamine and norepinephrine, which are closely associated with the acute effects of cannabis ingestion, such as euphoria and anxiety. Some effects may include a general altered state of consciousness, euphoria, relaxation or stress reduction, increased appreciation of the arts, including humor and music, joviality, metacognition and introspection, enhanced recollection (episodic memory), and increased sensuality, sensory awareness, libido, and creativity. Abstract or philosophical thinking, disruption of linear memory and paranoia or anxiety are also typical. Anxiety is cannabis's most commonly reported adverse side effect. Up to 30 percent of recreational users experience intense anxiety and/or panic attacks after smoking cannabis. Some report anxiety only after not smoking cannabis for a prolonged period of time. In some cases, inexperience and use in an unfamiliar environment may be major contributing factors to this anxiety. Cannabidiol (CBD), another cannabinoid found in cannabis, has been shown to mitigate THC's adverse effects, including anxiety.

Cannabis produces many other subjective effects, including increased enjoyment of food taste and aroma, and marked distortions in the perception of time. At higher doses, effects can include altered body image, auditory or visual illusions, pseudohallucinations, and ataxia from selective impairment of polysynaptic reflexes.

While psychoactive drugs are typically categorized as stimulants, depressants, or hallucinogens, cannabis exhibits a mix of all of these effects. Scientific studies have suggested that other cannabinoids like CBD may also play a significant role in its psychoactive effects.

=== Cannabis-induced psychotic disorder ===
In some cases, cannabis can lead to acute psychosis and dissociative states such as depersonalization and derealization. Cannabis-induced psychotic disorder is a type of substance-induced psychosis. Even in those with no family history of psychosis, the administration of pure THC in clinical settings has been demonstrated to elicit transient psychotic symptoms. Any episode of acute psychosis that accompanies cannabis use usually abates after six hours, but in rare instances, users may find the symptoms continuing for many days. 1 in 200 users of cannabis, or 0.47%, experience cannabis-induced psychotic disorder.

=== Somatic effects ===
Cannabis use can decrease blood pressure, which increases the risk of fainting. Combining alcohol with cannabis greatly increases the level of impairment and the risk of injury or death from accidents.

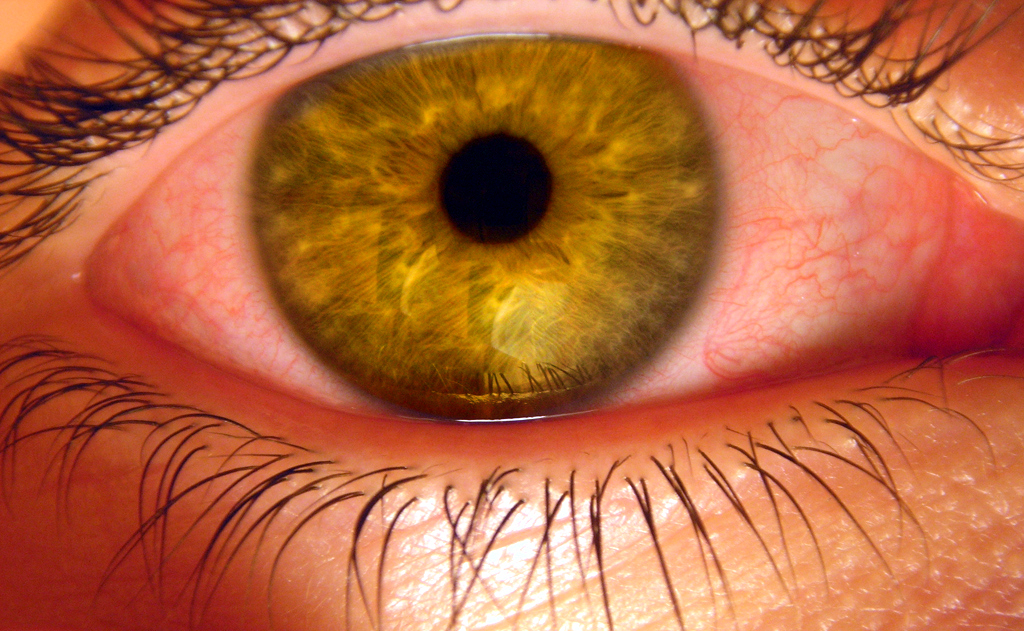
Bloodshot eye

Some of the short-term physical effects of cannabis use include increased heart rate, dry mouth, reddening of the eyes (congestion of the conjunctival blood vessels), a reduction in intra-ocular pressure, muscle relaxation, and a sensation of cold or hot hands and feet.

Electroencephalography (EEG) shows somewhat more persistent alpha waves of slightly lower frequency than usual. Cannabinoids produce a marked depression of motor activity via activation of receptors of cannabinoid receptor type 1.

=== Duration ===
Peak levels of cannabis-associated intoxication occur about 20 minutes after smoking it and last several hours. The total short-term duration of cannabis use when smoked depends on the potency, method of smoking – e.g. whether pure or in conjunction with tobacco – and quantity. Peak levels of intoxication typically last an average of three to four hours. When taken orally (in the form of capsules, food, or drink), the psychoactive effects take longer to manifest and generally last longer, typically an average of four to six hours after consumption. Oral ingestion use eliminates the need to inhale toxic combustion products created by smoking and therefore negates the risk of respiratory harm associated with cannabis smoking.

=== Appetite ===
Increased appetite after cannabis use has been documented for hundreds of years and is known colloquially as the "munchies". Clinical studies and survey data have found that cannabis increases food enjoyment and interest in food. A 2015 study suggests that cannabis triggers uncharacteristic behaviour in proopiomelanocortin (POMC) neurons, which are usually associated with decreasing hunger.

Endogenous cannabinoids, more commonly known as endocannabinoids, exist in cow and human milk. It is widely accepted that the neonatal survival of many species is largely dependent upon their suckling behavior, and research has identified the endogenous cannabinoid system as the first neural system to display complete control over milk ingestion and neonatal survival.

=== Cardiovascular effects ===
Short-term (one to two hours) effects of cannabis on the cardiovascular system can include increased heart rate, dilation of blood vessels, and fluctuations in blood pressure. There are medical reports of occasional heart attacks or myocardial infarction, stroke, and other cardiovascular side effects. Cannabis's cardiovascular effects are not associated with serious health problems for most young, healthy users. Researchers reported in the International Journal of Cardiology, "Marijuana use by older people, particularly those with some degree of coronary artery or cerebrovascular disease, poses greater risks due to the resulting increase in catecholamines, cardiac workload, and carboxyhemoglobin levels, and concurrent episodes of profound postural hypotension. Indeed, marijuana may be a much more common cause of myocardial infarction than is generally recognized. In day-to-day practice, a history of marijuana use is often not sought by many practitioners, and even when sought, the patient's response is not always truthful".

A 2013 analysis of 3,886 myocardial infarction survivors over an 18-year period showed "no statistically significant association between marijuana use and mortality".

A 2008 study by the National Institutes of Health Biomedical Research Centre in Baltimore found that heavy, chronic smoking of marijuana (138 joints per week) changed blood proteins associated with heart disease and stroke.

A 2000 study by researchers at Boston's Beth Israel Deaconess Medical Center, Massachusetts General Hospital, and Harvard School of Public Health found that a middle-aged person's risk of heart attack rises nearly fivefold in the first hour after smoking cannabis, "roughly the same risk seen within an hour of sexual activity".

Cannabis arteritis is a very rare peripheral vascular disease similar to Buerger's disease. There were about 50 confirmed cases from 1960 to 2008, all in Europe.

=== Memory and learning ===
Studies on cannabis and memory are hindered by small sample sizes, confounding drug use, and other factors. The strongest evidence regarding cannabis and memory focuses on its temporary negative effects on short-term and working memory.

In a 2001 study of neuropsychological performance in long-term cannabis users, researchers found "some cognitive deficits appear detectable at least 7 days after heavy cannabis use but appear reversible and related to recent cannabis exposure rather than irreversible and related to cumulative lifetime use". Of his studies on cannabis use, lead researcher and Harvard professor Harrison Pope said he found it is not dangerous over the long term, but there are short-term effects. From neuropsychological tests, Pope found that chronic cannabis users showed difficulty with verbal memory in particular for "at least a week or two" after they stopped smoking. Within 28 days, memory problems vanished and the subjects "were no longer distinguishable from the comparison group". Researchers at the University of California, San Diego School of Medicine failed to show substantial, systemic neurological effects from long-term cannabis use. Their findings were published in the July 2003 issue of the Journal of the International Neuropsychological Society. The research team, headed by Igor Grant, found that cannabis use affects perception but does not cause permanent brain damage. Researchers looked at data from 15 previously published controlled studies involving 704 long-term cannabis users and 484 nonusers. The results showed long-term cannabis use was only marginally harmful on memory and learning. Other functions such as reaction time, attention, language, reasoning ability, and perceptual and motor skills were unaffected. The observed effects on memory and learning, they said, showed long-term cannabis use caused "selective memory defects", but "of a very small magnitude". A study by Johns Hopkins University School of Medicine found that heavy cannabis use is associated with decrements in neurocognitive performance even after 28 days of abstinence.

=== Effects on driving ===
Several studies have shown increased risk associated with cannabis use by drivers, but others have found no increased risk. Cannabis usage has been shown in some studies to have an adverse effect on driving ability. The British Medical Journal indicated that "drivers who consume cannabis within three hours of driving are nearly twice as likely to cause a vehicle collision as those who are not under the influence of drugs or alcohol".

In Cannabis and driving: a review of the literature and commentary, the United Kingdom's Department for Transport reviewed data on cannabis and driving, finding that, although impaired, "subjects under cannabis treatment appear to perceive that they are indeed impaired. Where they can compensate, they do". In a review of driving simulator studies, researchers found that "even in those who learn to compensate for a drug's impairing effects, substantial impairment in performance can still be observed under conditions of general task performance (i.e. when no contingencies are present to maintain compensated performance)."

A 2012 meta-analysis found that acute cannabis use increased the risk of an automobile crash. An extensive 2013 review of 66 studies of crash risk and drug use found that cannabis is associated with slightly but not statistically significantly increased odds of injury or fatal accident.

In the largest and most precisely controlled study of its kind, carried out by the U.S. Department of Transportation's National Highway Traffic Safety Administration, it was found that other "studies that measure the presence of THC in the drivers' blood or oral fluid, rather than relying on self-report tend to have much lower (or no) elevated crash risk estimates. Likewise better controlled studies have found lower (or no) elevated crash risk estimates". The study found that "after adjusting for age, gender, race and alcohol use, drivers who tested positive for marijuana were no more likely to crash than those who had not used any drugs or alcohol prior to driving". A 2018 study found that fatal crashes involving cannabis increased in Colorado, Washington, and Massachusetts after recreational cannabis legalization or decriminalization.

=== Effects on sexual function ===
Human consumption of cannabis (which is commonly known as marijuana, pot or weed) is commonly thought to enhance sexual pleasure but there is limited scientific research on the relationship between cannabis and sex, in part due to U.S. drug policies that focus on prohibition. Effects of cannabis are difficult to study because sexual arousal and functioning are extremely complex and differ among individuals. Cannabis affects people differently, making it difficult to study. Both men and women report greater sexual pleasure after having consumed cannabis but there is no scientific evidence of the effects on the physiological components of the sexual response cycle when using the drug.

=== Combination with other drugs ===
A confounding factor in cannabis research is the prevalent usage of other recreational drugs, especially alcohol and nicotine. Such complications demonstrate the need for studies with stronger controls, and investigations into alleged symptoms of cannabis use that may also be caused by tobacco. Some critics question whether agencies doing the research make an honest effort to present an unbiased summary of the evidence without "cherry-picking" data to please funding sources such as the tobacco industry or governments dependent on cigarette tax revenue; others caution that the raw data, and not the final conclusions, are what should be examined.

The Australian National Household Survey of 2001 found that cannabis is rarely used in Australia without other drugs. 95% of cannabis users also drank alcohol; 26% took amphetamines; 19% took ecstasy and only 2.7% reported not having used any other drug with cannabis. While there has been research on the combined effects of alcohol and cannabis on performing certain tasks, little has been done on the reasons this combination is so popular. Evidence from a controlled experimental study by Lukas and Orozco suggests that alcohol causes THC to be absorbed more rapidly into the user's blood plasma. Data from the Australian National Survey of Mental Health and Wellbeing found that three-quarters of recent cannabis users reported using alcohol when cannabis was not available, suggesting that the two have similar effects.

=== Pathogens and microtoxins ===
Most microorganisms found in cannabis affect only plants, not humans, but some, especially those that proliferate when the herb is not correctly dried and stored, can be harmful to humans. Some users store cannabis in an airtight bag or jar in a refrigerator to prevent fungal and bacterial growth.

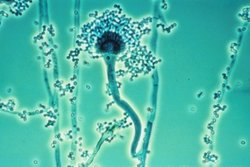
Aspergillus fumigatus

The fungi Aspergillus flavus, Aspergillus fumigatus, Aspergillus niger, Aspergillus parasiticus, Aspergillus tamarii, Aspergillus sulphureus, Aspergillus repens, Mucor hiemalis (not a human pathogen), Penicillium chrysogenum, Penicillium italicum, and Rhizopus nigricans have been found in moldy cannabis. Aspergillus mold species can infect the lungs via smoking or handling of infected cannabis and cause opportunistic and sometimes deadly aspergillosis. Some of the microorganisms found create aflatoxins, which are toxic and carcinogenic. Mold is also found in smoke from mold-infected cannabis, and the lungs and nasal passages are a major means of contracting fungal infections. Levitz and Diamond (1991) suggest baking cannabis in home ovens at 150 °C [302 °F], for five minutes before smoking. Oven treatment killed conidia of A. fumigatus, A. flavus and A. niger, and did not lower THC levels. Cannabis contaminated with Salmonella muenchen was correlated with dozens of cases of salmonellosis in 1981. Thermophilic actinomycetes were also found in cannabis.

== Long-term effects ==
Exposure to cannabis may have biologically based physical, mental, behavioral, and social health consequences and is "associated with diseases of the liver (particularly with co-existing hepatitis C), lungs, heart, eyesight, and vasculature" according to a 2013 literature review by Gordon and colleagues. The association with these diseases has been reported in only those cases where people have smoked cannabis. The authors cautioned that "evidence is needed, and further research should be considered, to prove causal associations of cannabis with many physical health conditions".

Cannabis use disorder is defined in the fifth revision of the Diagnostic and Statistical Manual of Mental Disorders (DSM-5) as a condition requiring treatment. Several drugs have been investigated in an attempt to ameliorate the symptoms of stopping cannabis use. Such drugs include bupropion, divalproex, nefazodone, lofexidine, and dronabinol. Of these, dronabinol (a trade name for THC) has proven the most effective. The drugs buspirone and rimonabant have shown some success in helping maintain cannabis abstinence.

There is evidence that long-term use of cannabis increases the risk of psychosis, regardless of confounding factors, and particularly for people who have genetic risk factors. A 2019 meta-analysis found that 34% of people with cannabis-induced psychosis transitioned to schizophrenia. This was found to be comparatively higher than hallucinogens (26%) and amphetamines (22%).

Long-term cannabis users are at risk for developing cannabinoid hyperemesis syndrome (CHS), characterized by recurrent bouts of intense vomiting and abdominal cramping during or within 48 hours of heavy cannabis use. The mechanism behind CHS is poorly understood and is contrary to the antiemetic properties of cannabis and cannabinoids. Of those who went to the emergency department (ED) with recurrent vomiting in one institution in the United States from 2005 to 2010, about 6% had the condition. The condition is usually not responsive to traditionally used antiemetics and the primary treatment is cessation from cannabis use.

Smoking cannabis may potentially cause cancer, due to carcinogens present in smoke.

== Effects in pregnancy ==
Cannabis consumption in pregnancy is an important public health issue. Research has found possible or likely associations between cannabis use and a risk of adverse outcomes in respect of cognitive development, mental health, physical health, and lactation.

Cannabis is the most commonly used controlled substance among pregnant women. It increases risk of fertility problems in both men and women, fetal development problems, and negative birth outcomes. The American College of Obstetricians and Gynecologists recommends that women avoid use of cannabis while trying to get pregnant, during pregnancy, and while breastfeeding.

== Effects in pediatrics ==
Children can become exposed to cannabis, typically through accidental exposure which can lead to very high doses, especially in the case of edibles. Unlike in adults, these levels of exposure can lead to major complications in children. These complications include encephalopathy, hypotension, respiratory depression severe enough to require ventilation, somnolence, coma, and in extreme cases, reports of death. Pediatric exposure to edibles is of increasing concern because these products are typically sweets (gummies, cookies, etc.), and their prevalence is increasing as cannabis is legalized or decriminalized in many territories.

== See also ==
- Effects of legalized cannabis
- Cannabis smoking
- Psychoactive drug
