= Canna Provisions v. Garland =

American lawsuit

Canna Provisions, Gyasi Sellers, Wiseacre Farm, Verano Holdings v. Merrick Garland is a lawsuit brought in late 2023 by cannabis industry entities against the U.S. Attorney General, arguing that the scheduling of cannabis under the Controlled Substances Act is unconstitutional.

== History ==
The case was brought in the United States District Court for the District of Massachusetts in late 2023. Boies Schiller Flexner LLP is one of the law firms representing the plaintiffs. Department of Justice moved to have the case dismissed, then later argued that the federal government had an interest in curtailing cannabis tourism between states. The case was scheduled for oral arguments on May 22, 2024. In July 2024, United States District Judge Mark G. Mastroianni dismissed the case; however, the plaintiffs subsequently filed an appeal with the United States Court of Appeals for the First Circuit. The First Circuit heard arguments in December, 2024.

== Legal theory ==
The legal theory of the case is that although in Gonzales v. Raich, the Supreme Court "reasoned that because Congress intended to 'eradicate' cannabis from interstate commerce, the federal government had a rational and thus lawful purpose in encroaching on states' cannabis regulation", this Commerce Clause-centric logic no longer pertains in the 2020s, as the Federal Government "continues to largely take a hands-off approach with regard to state-legal cannabis" under the Cole Memorandum and its successors, appropriations riders, (Note: "In each fiscal year since FY2015, Congress has included provisions in appropriations acts that prohibit DOJ from using appropriated funds to prevent certain states, territories, and DC from “implementing their own laws that authorize the use, distribution, possession, or cultivation of medical marijuana” ... [T]he appropriations rider bars DOJ from taking legal action against the states directly in order to prevent them from promulgating or enforcing medical marijuana laws. In addition, federal courts have interpreted the rider to prohibit certain federal prosecutions of private individuals or organizations that produce, distribute, or possess marijuana in accordance with state medical marijuana laws.") and other institutional practices, including blanket Presidential pardons issued under the Biden Administration for prior cannabis-related offenses. In the plaintiffs' words,

The federal government no longer operates under any assumption that banning intrastate marijuana is necessary to policing interstate marijuana... [and] long ago abandoned the goal of eliminating marijuana from commerce. Nor does Congress have any comprehensive — or even consistent and rational — approach to marijuana regulation. This inconsistent, patchwork approach to marijuana regulation provides no basis for Congress to regulate intrastate marijuana.

The theory may follow comments made by Justice Thomas in a 2021 response to a request for certiorari, in which Thomas said Gonzales may no longer apply and Federal prohibition "may no longer be necessary or proper."

== See also ==
- Legality of the war on drugs
