= Boies Schiller Flexner LLP =

American law firm

- Headquarters: 55 Hudson Yards; New York City, United States
- No. of offices: 15
- No. of attorneys: 250
- Major practice areas: Litigation
- Key people: David Boies (chairman), Jonathan D. Schiller, Donald L. Flexner
- Date founded: May 1997
- Founder: David Boies, Jonathan D. Schiller
- Company type: Limited liability partnership
- Website: www.bsfllp.com

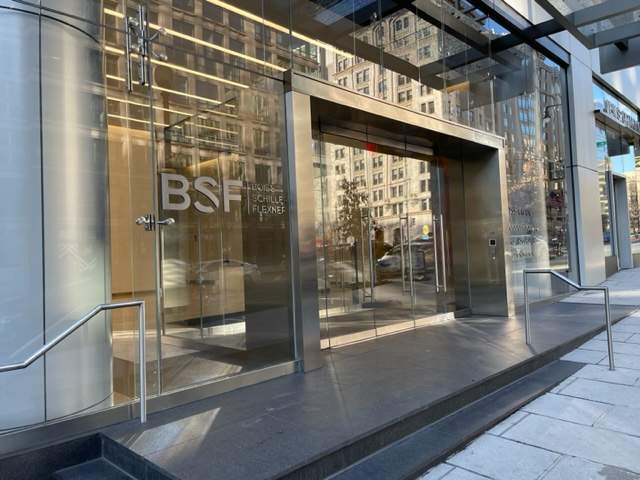
Outside the D.C. offices of Boies Schiller Flexner LLP.

Boies (Note: Boies is pronounced /bɔɪz/ BOYZ.) Schiller Flexner LLP is an American law firm based in New York City. The firm was founded in 1997 by David Boies and Jonathan D. Schiller, who were joined in 1999 by Donald L. Flexner, a former partner with Crowell & Moring.

The firm has become known for its involvement in high-profile litigation, having represented the Department of Justice in the antitrust lawsuit United States v. Microsoft, as well as Al Gore in the Supreme Court case Bush v. Gore. Boies successfully challenged the constitutionality of California's Proposition 8 in Perry v. Brown, and represented the National Football League in the antitrust litigation initiated by the players' union.

The firm has drawn controversy for its representation of sex offender Harvey Weinstein amidst his sexual abuse allegations, as well as its representation of the blood testing startup Theranos.

== Notable clients ==
Among other high-profile clients, Boies Schiller Flexner has long represented film producer Harvey Weinstein, against whom sexual abuse allegations were levied in October 2017. The New Yorker reported in November 2017 that Boies Schiller Flexner had, on Weinstein's behalf, directed private intelligence companies, including Black Cube, to spy on and orchestrate smear campaigns against alleged victims of Weinstein's and on reporters who were investigating Weinstein's actions. The New York Times, which was at the same time a target of the reported espionage and a client of Boies Schiller Flexner's, considered this "intolerable conduct". The New York Times announced a few days later it had "terminated its relationship" with Boies' firm.

David Boies represented Theranos for several years, including against the fraud claims that toppled the blood-testing company. In Bad Blood: Secrets and Lies in a Silicon Valley Startup by The Wall Street Journal investigative reporter John Carreyrou, the firm is described as protecting the startup using surveillance of witnesses and journalists, weaponized use of non-disclosure agreements and affidavits, intimidation tactics, and other heavy-handed practices. Boies Schiller Flexner is portrayed by Carreyrou as acting as an extension of Theranos, including the use of the law firm's New York offices for hosting promotional meetings such as a faked blood test administered to Fortune writer Roger Parloff. According to Carreyrou, the firm agreed to be paid in Theranos stock, and Boies himself served on the Theranos board of directors, raising questions about conflicts of interest. Boies Schiller Flexner ended its representation of Theranos in November 2016 due to disagreements about legal strategy. Former Theranos general counsel Heather King was hired back by Boies Schiller Flexner after having served as the general counsel at Theranos.

The firm also represents Amazon in corporate matters, and Amazon founder and CEO Jeff Bezos personally retained attorneys from Boies Schiller Flexner as part of his crisis-management team in the wake of Bezos's claims of extortion by AMI.

The firm represented former Blackwater CEO Erik Prince in a defamation suit against The Intercept in 2020.

== Notable lawyers and alumni ==
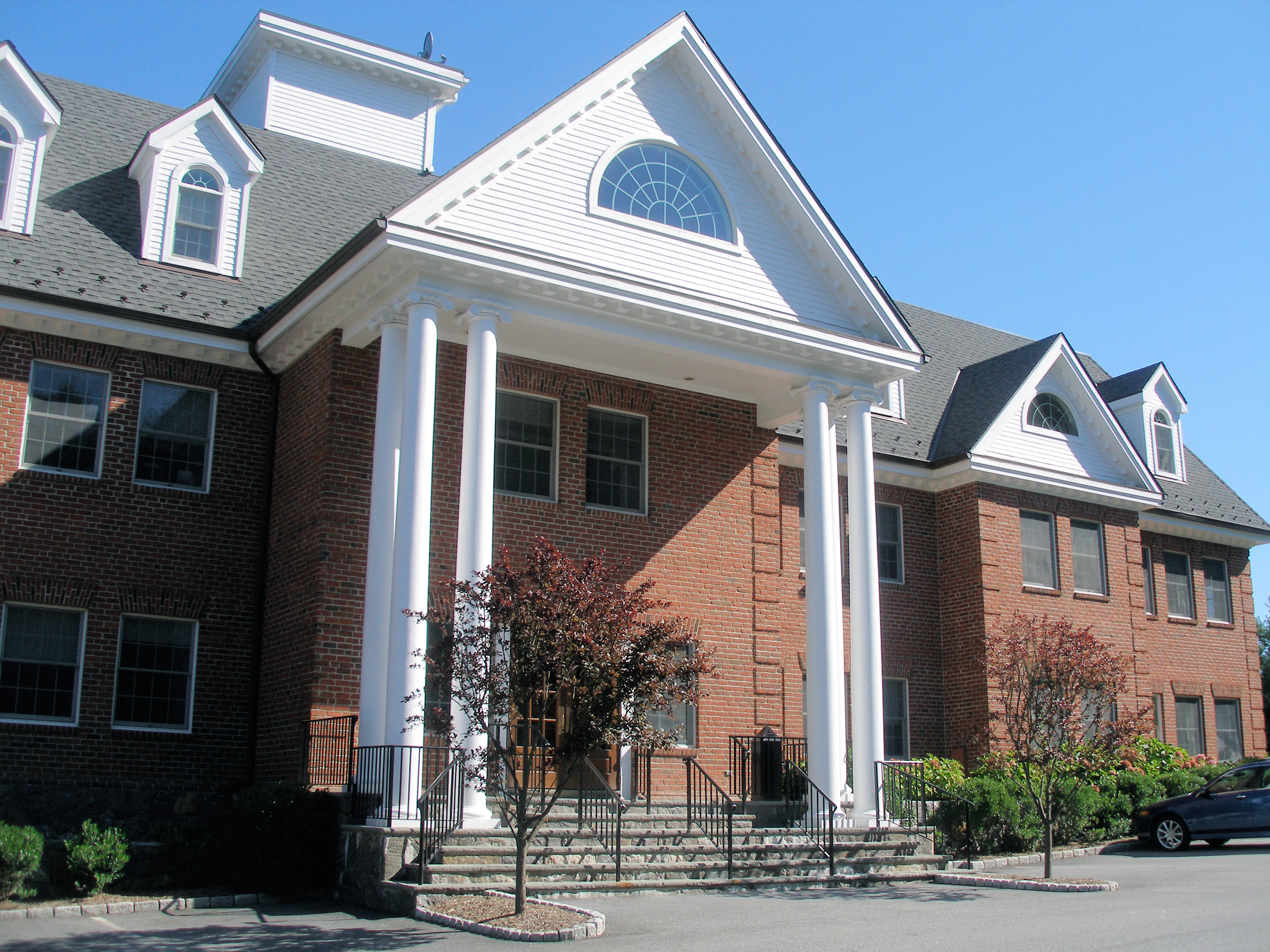
The firm's original headquarters in Armonk, New York

- Hunter Biden, son of President Joe Biden, is a former counsel.
- David Boies, former chairman of the firm, is a former partner.
- Tanya Chutkan, a United States District Judge for the District of Columbia, is a former partner of the firm's Washington, D.C. office.
- Hampton Dellinger, a partner, former head of the US Office of Special Counsel.
- Susan Estrich, a former partner, was the first female president of the Harvard Law Review.
- Kirsten Gillibrand, U.S. Senator from New York, is a former partner.
- Ann O'Leary, the chief of staff to California Governor Gavin Newsom and former co-executive director of the Clinton-Kaine Transition Team, is a former partner.
- Kyle Roche, former associate
- Jonathan D. Schiller, managing partner of the firm, was the Chairman of the Board of Trustees of Columbia University from 2013 to 2018.
- Elizabeth Wurtzel, a writer and journalist, is a former associate.
- Stephen N. Zack, a partner, was president of the American Bar Association from 2010 to 2011.
- Shira A. Scheindlin, of counsel, former U.S. District Judge for the Southern District of New York (SDNY)

== See also ==
- SCO–Linux disputes
- Dalvik (software)
- Canna Provisions v. Garland
