= Movat's stain =

Staining dye

Movat's stain is a pentachrome stain originally developed by Henry Zoltan Movat (1923–1995), a Hungarian-Canadian Pathologist in Toronto in 1955 to highlight the various constituents of connective tissue, especially cardiovascular tissue, by five colors in a single stained slide. In 1972, H. K. Russell, Jr. modified the technique so as to reduce the time for staining and to increase the consistency and reliability of the staining, creating the Russell–Movat stain.

Interpretation of results
Colour	Tissue type
Black	Nuclei; elastic fibres
Yellow	Collagen fibres; reticular fibres
Blue	Ground substance; mucin
Bright red	Fibrin
Red	Muscle

== Principle ==
Modified Russell–Movat staining highlights numerous tissue components in histological slides. It is obtained by a mix of five stains: alcian blue, Verhoeff hematoxylin and crocein scarlet combined with acidic fuchsine and saffron. At pH 2.5, alcian blue is fixed by electrostatic binding with the acidic mucopolysaccharides. The Verhoeff hematoxylin has a high affinity for nuclei and elastin fibers, negatively charged. The combination of crocein scarlet with acidic fuchsine stains acidophilic tissue components in red. Then, collagen and reticulin fibers are unstained by a reaction with phosphotungstic acid and stained in yellow by saffron.

== Uses ==
Modified Russell–Movat staining is used to study the heart, blood vessels and connective tissues. It can also be used to diagnose vascular and lung diseases.

== Gallery ==
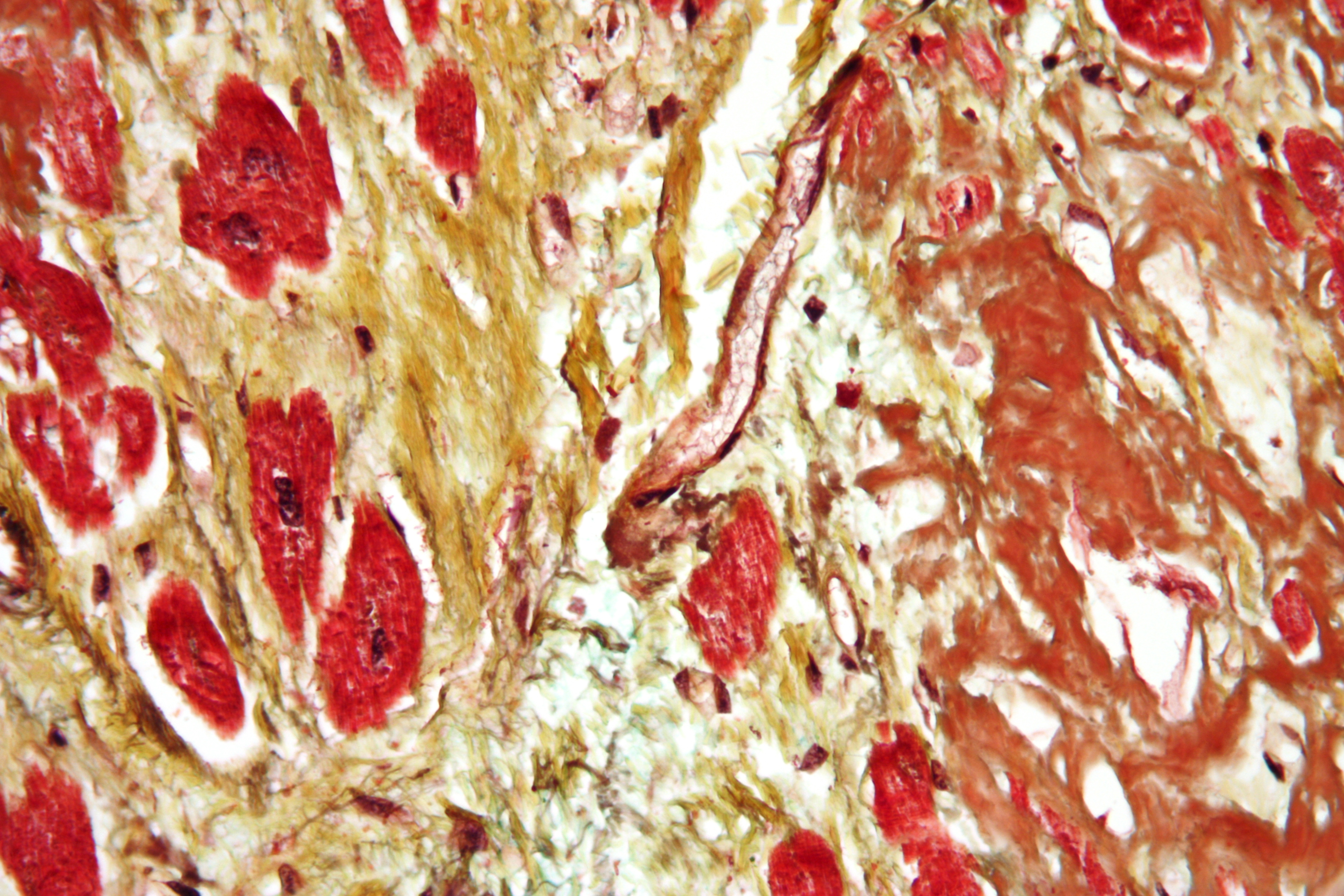
Movat's stain showing amyloid (brown) and fibrosis (yellow) of the heart

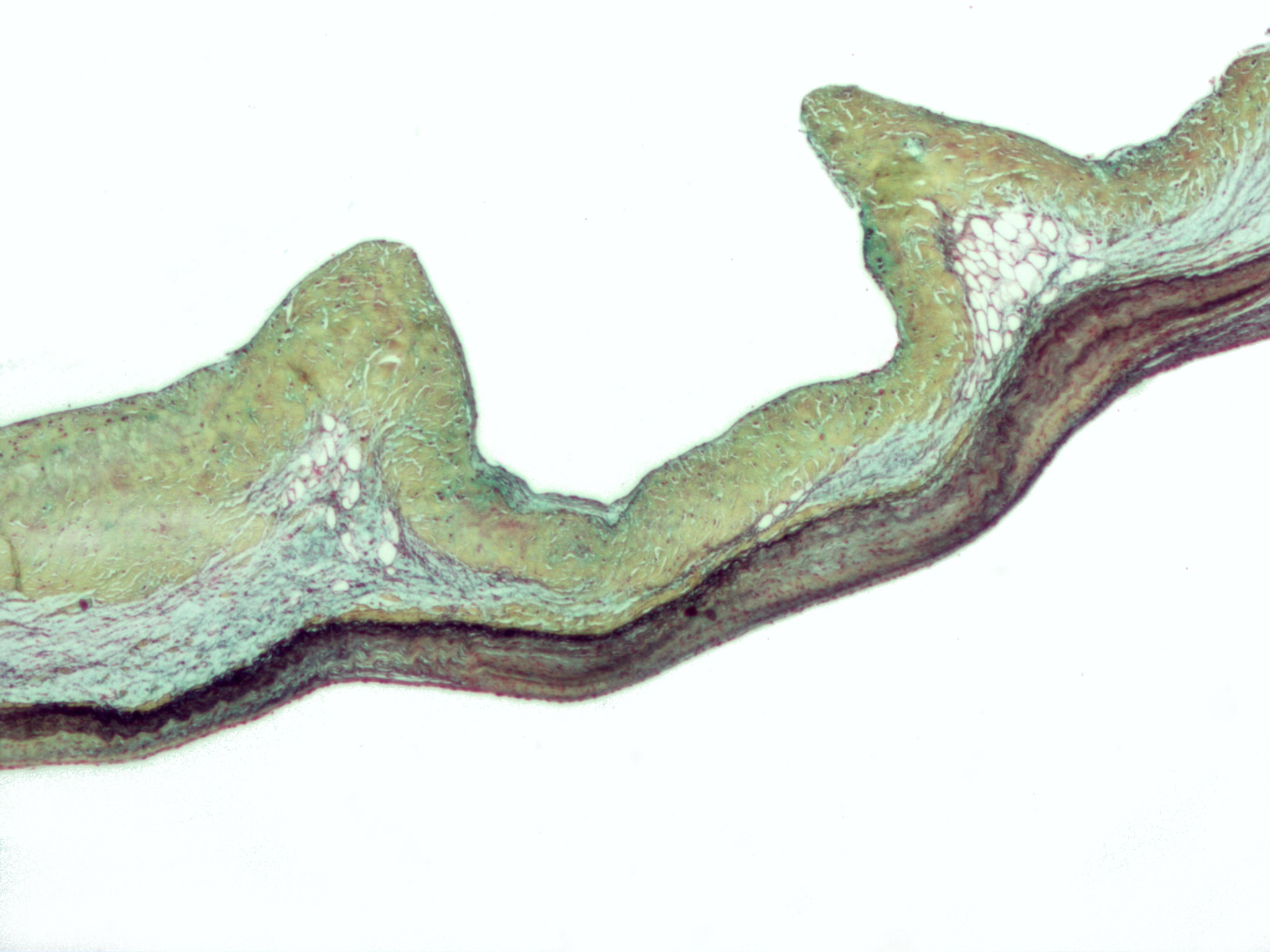
Movat's stain showing thickening of the spongiosa layer (blue) in myxomatous degeneration of the aortic valve

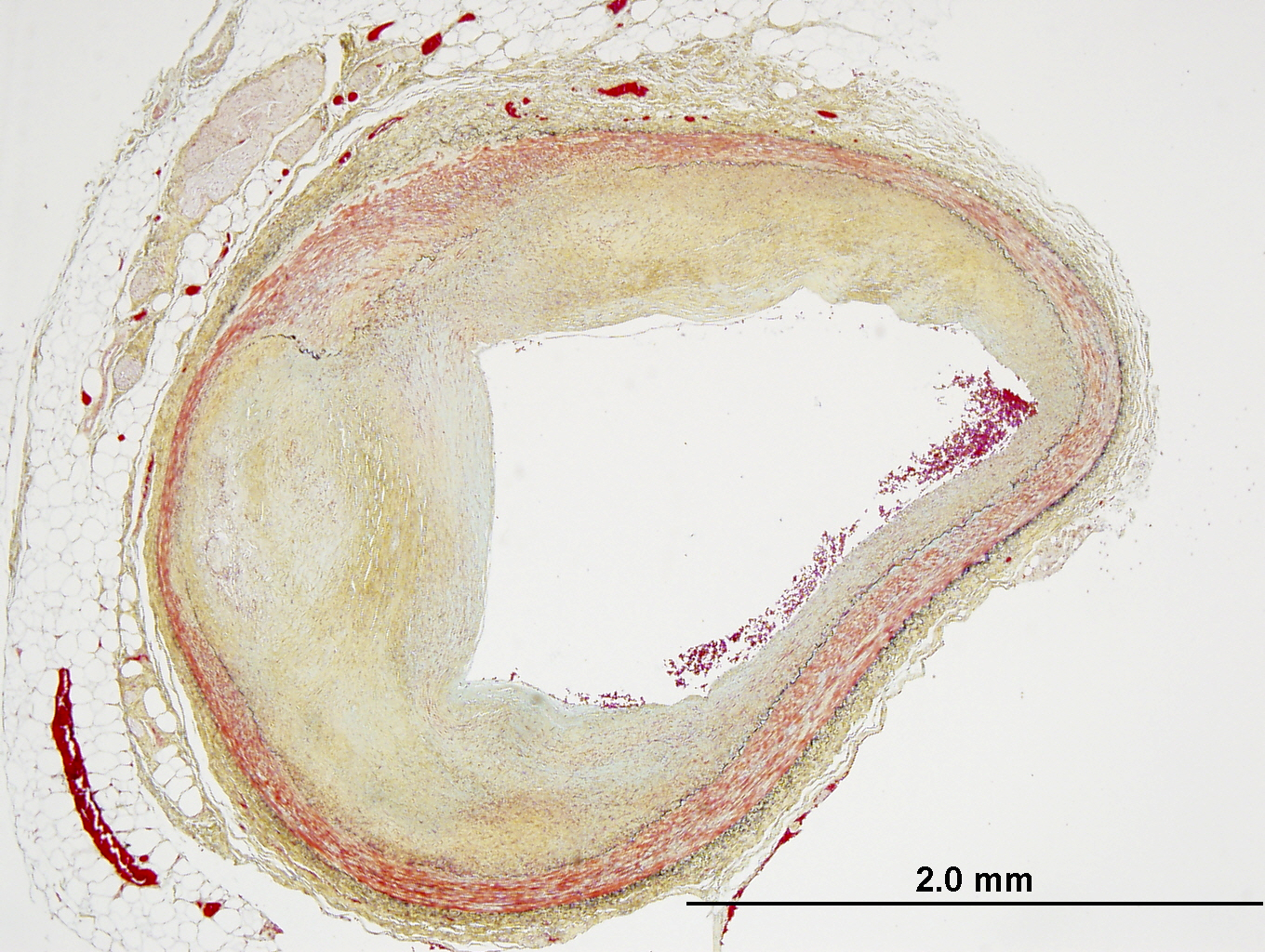
Movat's stain showing luminal stenosis in coronary artery atherosclerosis

== See also ==
- Cardiovascular disease
