= Effects of legalized cannabis =

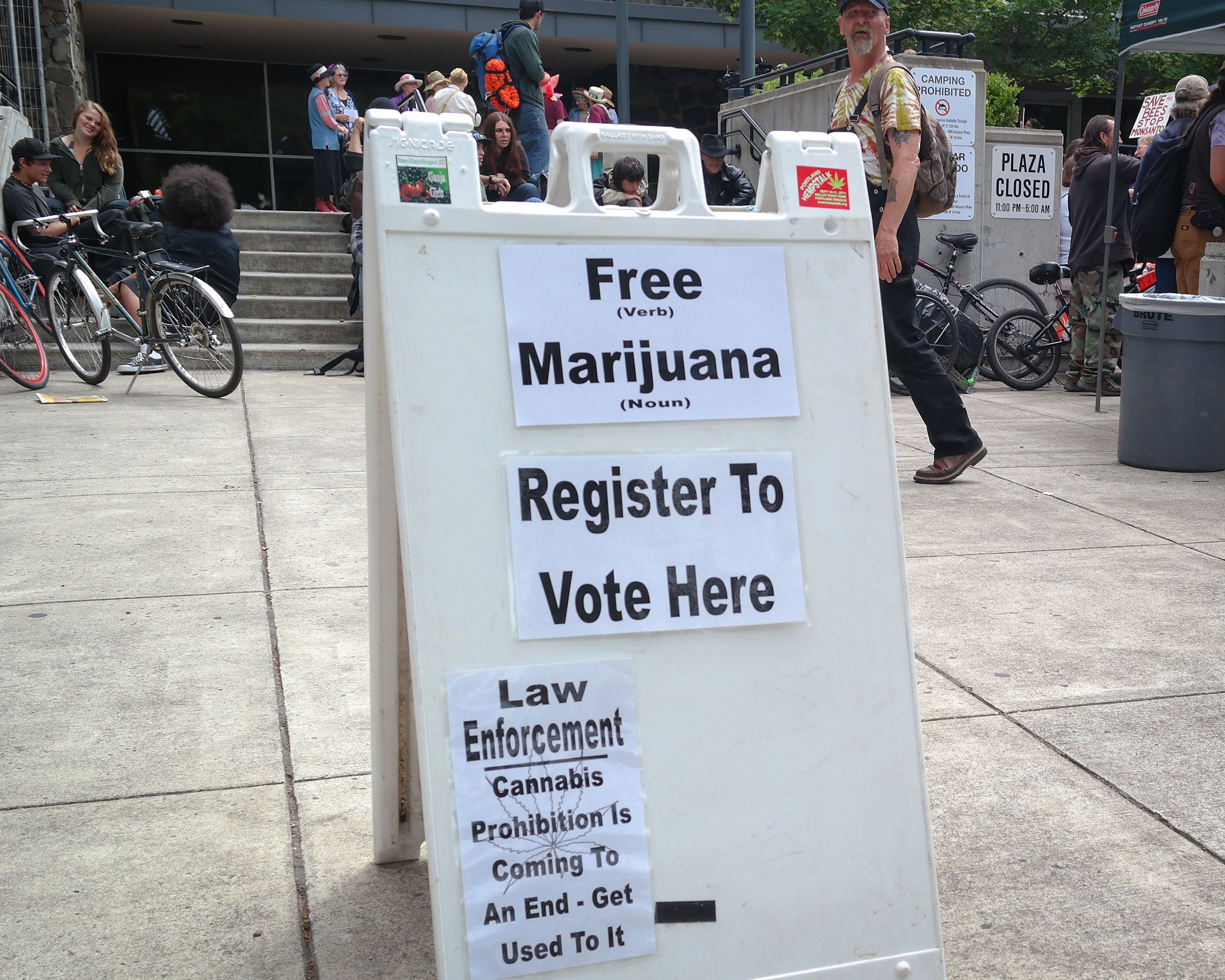
A sign supporting marijuana legalization at the Wayne Morse Free Speech Plaza in Eugene, Oregon

The use of cannabis as a recreational drug has been outlawed in many countries for several decades. As a result of long-fought legalization efforts, several countries such as Uruguay and Canada, as well as several states in the US, have legalized the production, sale, possession, and recreational and/or medical usage of cannabis. The broad legalization of cannabis in this fashion can have numerous effects on the economy and society in which it is legalized.

== General evidence ==
There is evidence that ready access to legal cannabis is associated with a number of health harms including increased need for emergency medicine, and increased incidence of cannabis use disorder and road traffic accident.

=== Effects on crime and law enforcement ===
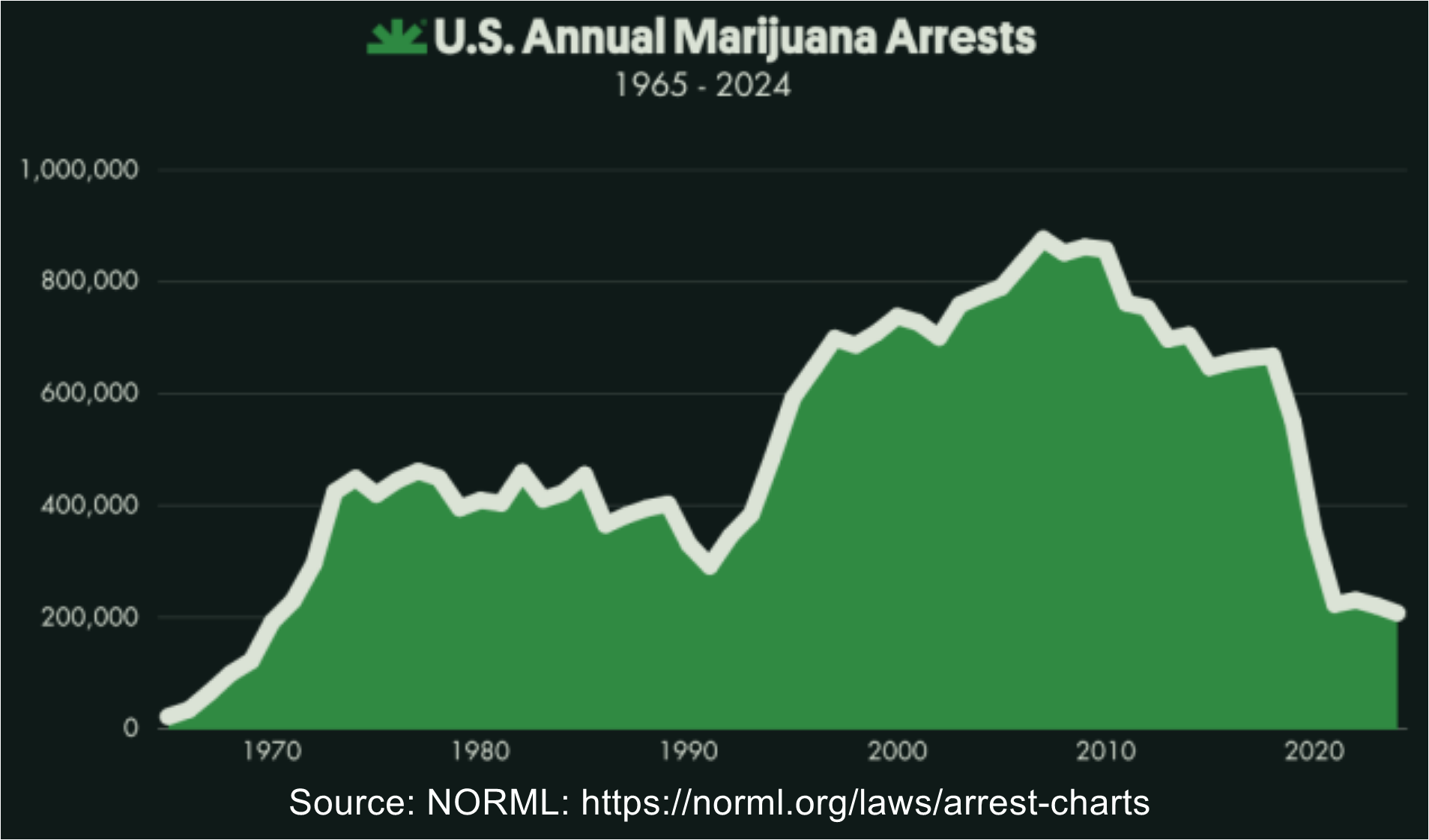
US annual marijuana arrests. NORML.

Studies indicate that cannabis decriminalization and legalization lead to fewer cannabis-related arrests. A 2019 analysis of Prince George's County, Maryland found a 54% decrease in county-wide arrest rates for cannabis possession following decriminalization. However, this coincided with a 1,031% increase in cannabis possession citations, suggesting a possible "net-widening effect" where more individuals overall faced enforcement action through citations rather than arrests.

Research suggests that cannabis legalization and decriminalization have little impact on general crime rates, with some studies indicating potential decreases in certain areas. A fifty-state study comparing violent and property crime rates between 2010-2014 found that crime rates tended to be slightly higher in states where cannabis was completely prohibited, though this difference was not statistically significant.

=== Effects on youth and public Health ===
Research has identified several potential risks of adolescent cannabis use following legalization, including impaired cognitive functioning, increased risk of developing cannabis dependence, elevated rates of school dropout, elevated risk of developing psychotic illnesses, and increased rates of engaging in risky behaviors. Weekly cannabis use under age 18 has been associated with decreased intelligence among those who develop persistent dependence. Studies indicate adolescents may be more adversely affected by heavy use than adults, particularly in domains of learning, memory, and working memory.

A 2021 study from the Cato Institute, a libertarian think tank, found that many strong claims made by both advocates and critics of state-level marijuana legalization are substantially overstated and in some cases entirely without real-world support. The study concluded that state legalizations have generally had minor effects, with tax revenue being a notable exception that has exceeded some expectations.

=== United States ===
News report from Voice of America about businesses related to cannabis in the United States. Aired 23 September 2015

A 2015 study found that medical marijuana legalization increased use and abuse by those under and over the age of 21. A 2017 study found that frequency of marijuana use by students increased significantly after recreational legalization and that increase was especially large for females and for Black and Hispanic students.

While overall arrests have decreased, racial disparities in cannabis-related arrests persist post-legalization. In Washington state, following retail legalization, disparities in arrest rates between Black and White adults grew from 2.5 times higher to 5 times higher, despite an overall 87% decrease in possession arrests for both groups.

A 2017 study found that the introduction of medical marijuana laws caused a reduction in violent crime in Americans states that border Mexico: "The reduction in crime is strongest for counties close to the border (less than 350 km), and for crimes that relate to drug trafficking. In addition, we find that [medical marijuana laws] in inland states lead to a reduction in crime in the nearest border state. Our results are consistent with the theory that decriminalization of the production and distribution of marijuana leads to a reduction in violent crime in markets that are traditionally controlled by Mexican drug trafficking organisations."

A 2020 study found that junk food sales increased between 3.2 and 4.5 percent in states that had legalized cannabis.

A 2022 study found that legalization had led to a 20% increase in use of cannabis in the US. Pharmaceutical companies had lower returns.

==== Health effects ====
Cannabinoid hyperemesis syndrome, resulting from heavy cannabis use, is characterized by nausea, vomiting, and abdominal pain. It can lead to severe dehydration, seizures, kidney failure, and cardiac arrest, with at least eight reported deaths in the United States. Since its documentation in 2004, there has been a significant rise in reported cases. Accurate tracking of the condition is difficult due to inconsistent recording in medical records. Researchers estimate that up to one-third of near-daily cannabis users in the U.S. may experience symptoms, ranging from mild to severe, affecting approximately six million people. According to data from the nonprofit Health Care Cost Institute, cannabis-related diagnoses among individuals under 65 with employer-paid insurance increased by over 50 percent nationwide between 2016 and 2022, rising from approximately 341,000 to 522,000.

Legalization has led to a decreased perception of cannabis use as "risky" and "potentially harmful". A 2013 study showed that 32.8% of people surveyed in Utah, a state where Marijuana use is illegal, believed that they had a risk of harm from Marijuana consumption, whereas only 18.8% of people surveyed in Washington, a state where adult-use is legal, believed they had a risk of harm.

==== Economic impact ====
In 2019, the US gained a total of 1.7 billion dollars in tax revenue due to the legalization of marijuana. In 2021, that number more than doubled to 3.7 billion dollars. The increase in tax revenue being a driving factor in the legalization of marijuana is similar to the effects of the repeal of prohibition. After prohibition was abolished, the percentage of federal government revenue coming from alcohol increased about 7% in the US.

Legalization is anticipated to reduce the resources expended on arrests and prosecution for marijuana-related crimes. A 2007 analysis found that legalization could result in a potential savings of $10.7 billion per year. A 2010 report predicted that full marijuana legalization could save the United States more than $13 billion a year, with $8 billion of that amount resulting from no longer having to enforce prohibition.

The legalization of marijuana has created significant job opportunities. The industry supports nearly 430,000 full-time jobs, with projections suggesting this could rise to over 1.75 million jobs in the near future. With over 100,000 jobs created in 2021, there was approximately a 33% increase from the previous year, significantly outpacing the projected 8% increase in jobs in the business and financial sector.

==== Colorado ====
News report by Voice of America about the business effect of cannabis in Colorado, with 700 million dollars in sales

In Colorado, effects since 2014 include increased state revenues, violent crime decreased, and an increase in homeless population. One Colorado hospital has received a 15% increase in babies born with THC in their blood.

Since legalization, public health and law enforcement officials in Colorado have grappled with a number of issues, serving as a model for policy problems that come with legalization. Marijuana-related hospital visits have nearly doubled between 2011, prior to legalization, and 2014. Top public health administrators in Colorado have cited the increased potency of today's infused products, often referred to as "edibles", as a cause for concern. They have also highlighted the risk that edibles pose to children, as they are often undistinguishable from ordinary foods once they are removed from their packaging. Youth usage has also been a major aspect of the debate surrounding marijuana legalization and a concern for state officials. Overall youth usage rates have increased, although not enough to be deemed statistically significant. Looking at students in the eighth, tenth, and twelfth grades, a survey study published in the Journal of the American Medical Association found that usage rates had not increased among any of the different age groups in Colorado, although statistically significant increases in usage rates amongst eighth and tenth graders were reported in Washington.

==== Oregon ====
Oregon legalized cannabis in November 2014. Effects have included an increase in cannabis-related calls to the Oregon state poison center, an increase in perception among youth that marijuana use is harmful, a decrease in arrest rates for cannabis related offenses, stores sold $250 million in cannabis products which resulted in $70 million in state tax revenue (higher than a predicted $36 million in revenue), 10% decrease in violent crime, and 13% drop in murder rate.

==== Washington D.C. ====
Washington D.C. legalized cannabis in 2015. Cannabis possession arrests decreased 98% from 2014 to 2015 and all cannabis offenses dropped by 85%.

=== Uruguay ===
Effects of cannabis legalization in Uruguay since 2013 include other countries in the region loosening laws concerning cannabis and lower costs of illegal cannabis. The percentage of female prisoners has fallen.

== See also ==
- Cannabis rights
- Drug liberalization
- Drug Policy Alliance
- Green rush
- Harm reduction
- Legality of cannabis
- Legality of the War on Drugs
- National Organization for the Reform of Marijuana Laws
