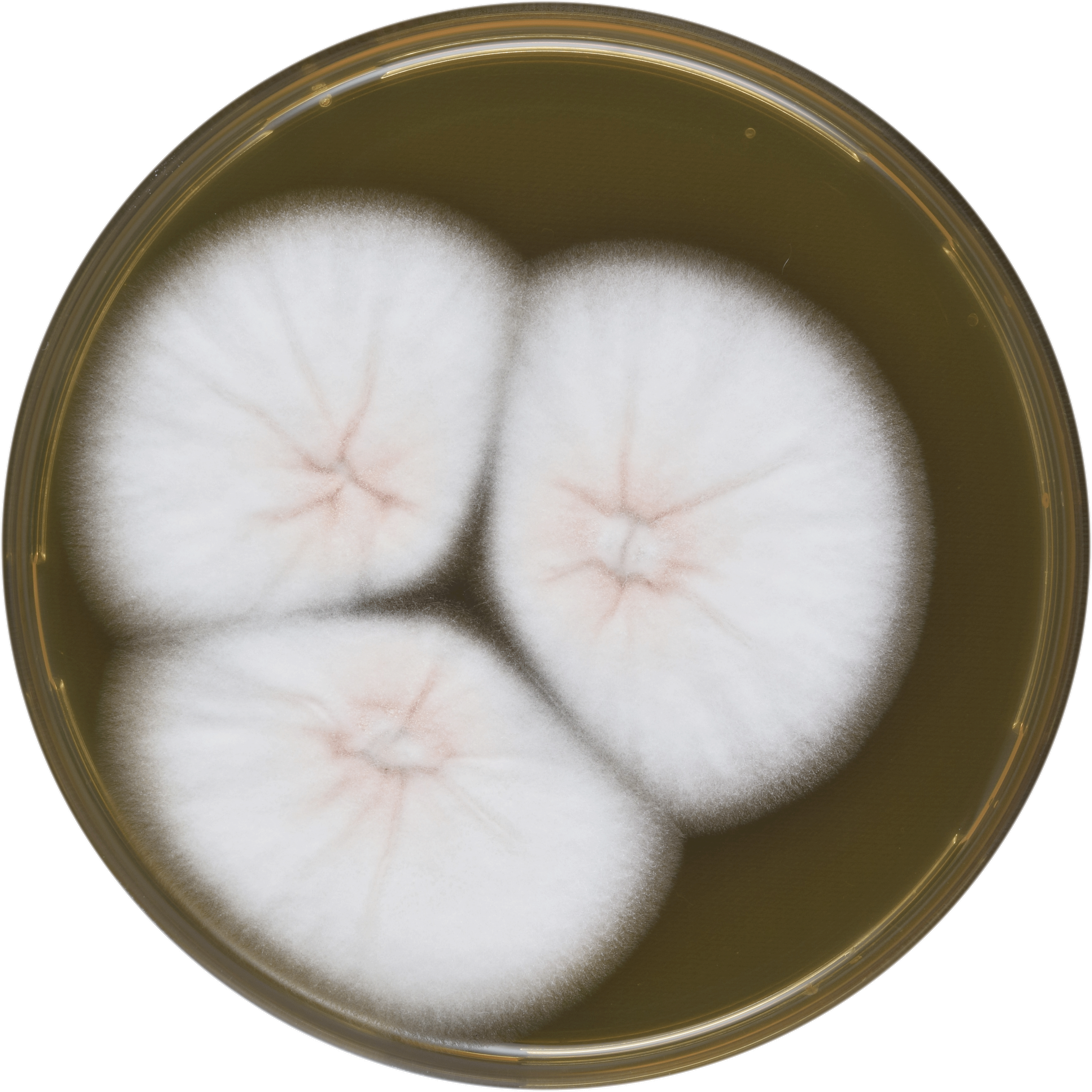

Scientific classification
- Kingdom: Fungi
- Division: Ascomycota
- Class: Eurotiomycetes
- Order: Eurotiales
- Family: Aspergillaceae
- Genus: Aspergillus
- Species: A. sulphureus

Binomial name
- Aspergillus sulphureus (Fresen.) Thom & Church, 1926

= Aspergillus sulphureus =

Species of fungus

Aspergillus sulphureus is a species of fungus belonging to the family Aspergillaceae.
