= Legality of the war on drugs =

Several authors have put forth arguments concerning the legality of the war on drugs. In his essay The Drug War and the Constitution, libertarian philosopher Paul Hager makes the case that the war on drugs in the United States is an illegal form of prohibition, which violates the principles of a limited government embodied in the United States Constitution.

== Federalism argument ==
In her dissent in Gonzales v. Raich (a case argued by Randy Barnett), Justice Sandra Day O'Connor argued that drug prohibition is an improper usurpation of the power to regulate interstate commerce, and the power to prohibit should be reserved by the states. In the same case, Justice Clarence Thomas wrote a stronger dissent expressing a similar idea. Chief Justice William Rehnquist joined O'Connor's dissent.

== Substantive due process ==
Another argument against drug prohibition is based on the notion that its practice violates implicit rights within the substantive due process doctrine. It has been suggested that anti-drug laws do not achieve enough reasonable benefit to State interests to justify arbitrarily restricting basic individual liberties that are supposed to be guaranteed by the Fourth Amendment and the Fourteenth Amendment to the US Constitution. One proponent of this notion is attorney Warren Redlich.

In 2002, the U.S. State of Florida attempted to eliminate criminal intent as an element of the crime of drug possession. On July 27, 2011, U.S. District Judge Mary S. Scriven ruled that the Florida law was unconstitutional, saying that the elimination of the element of intent was "atavistic and repugnant to the common law". Nellie King, president of the Florida Association of Criminal Defense Lawyers, explained the ruling in terms of due process. The ruling is subject to appeal.

The substantive due process argument is sometimes used in medical marijuana cases. NORML once wrote in an amicus brief on United States v. Oakland Cannabis Buyers' Cooperative that the right to use medical marijuana to save one's life is within the rights established by the substantive due process. However, the Supreme Court found against the medical marijuana dispensary and for the United States in the aforementioned case. Some apparently believe that this invalidates the substantive due process argument against the Controlled Substances Act.

However, the Supreme Court expressly declined to rule on the issue of substantive due process in the aforementioned case, ruling against the medical marijuana dispensary in question on grounds of statutory construction, as the Court found that there was no standalone medical necessity defense in the Controlled Substances Act. Justice Clarence Thomas' majority opinion clearly explains that the Court did not consider any Constitutional arguments in coming to the conclusion that it reached. As Justice Thomas expressly states in his majority opinion: "Finally, the Cooperative contends that we should construe the Controlled Substances Act to include a medical necessity defense in order to avoid what it considers to be difficult constitutional questions. In particular, the Cooperative asserts that, shorn of a medical necessity defense, the statute exceeds Congress’ Commerce Clause powers, violates the substantive due process rights of patients, and offends the fundamental liberties of the people under the Fifth, Ninth, and Tenth Amendments. As the Cooperative acknowledges, however, the canon of constitutional avoidance has no application in the absence of statutory ambiguity. Because we have no doubt that the Controlled Substances Act cannot bear a medical necessity defense to distributions of marijuana, we do not find guidance in this avoidance principle. Nor do we consider the underlying constitutional issues today. Because the Court of Appeals did not address these claims, we decline to do so in the first instance." As such, the question of the constitutionality of the Controlled Substances Act under the doctrine of substantive due process remains an open one, undecided by the Supreme Court, and debated by the citizens of the United States. Even some opponents of the substantive due process argument who support the war on drugs have noted that the doctrine could potentially lead to the invalidation of anti-drug laws.

== Rule of law ==
It is argued that the reverse burden of proof in drug-possession cases is incompatible with the rule of law in that the power to convict is effectively taken from the courts and given to those who are willing to plant evidence.
