= Cannabis arteritis =

Peripheral vascular disease

Cannabis arteritis, first reported in 1960, is a rare, peripheral vascular disease that has been associated with chronic cannabis use. The condition is characterized by ischemia and necrosis, typically of the lower limbs. Treatment usually involves cessation of cannabis use in addition to supportive medical and surgical measures depending on severity. In 2008, it was reported that 25% to 40% of patients with CA (cannabis arteritis) required amputations.

== Epidemiology ==
Fewer than 100 confirmed cases have been described in medical literature, mostly involving young men in their 20s or 30s. Between 1960 and 2008, approximately 50 cases were documented worldwide.

== Signs and symptoms ==
Symptoms may include claudication, Raynaud's phenomenon, sub-acute distal ischemia of lower limbs, absence of distal pulses, distal necrosis or gangrene of lower limbs, and venous thrombosis. Through arteriography, vascular occlusions, distal segmental lesions, and proximal lesions have been found.

== Case reports ==
An example of CA's progression can be observed through a case study of a 27-year-old woman and chronic cannabis user. In her case, it began with a bluish color in the skin, accompanied by extreme pain. After a few days, the patient developed a necrotic lesion. Through Doppler ultrasound examination, the arteries and blood flow both appeared normal. Further tests ruled out autoimmune and systemic diseases.

She stopped consuming cannabis and tobacco, and started a treatment of anticoagulants, aspirin, prostaglandin, and hyperbaric oxygen therapy. Through these measures, the necrosis stopped evolving; however, it did not regress. She required an amputation to remove the necrotic parts.

== Diagnosis ==
Controversy exists over the overwhelming concurrent tobacco use. CA presents similar symptoms to Buerger disease, making it hard to differentiate between the two. However, a case study of a 31-year-old man with limited tobacco exposure and a history of chronic cannabis use presented with the symptoms. Doctors concluded that the only possible cause of the symptoms was cannabis use. Additionally, a diagnosis of CA can only be made after systemic and autoimmune diseases have been ruled out.

Doctors and researchers assert a need for more information about patients' drug use histories in order to correctly diagnose CA.

The histopathological patterns of CA have not yet been identified.

== Treatment ==
The primary long-term intervention is cessation of cannabis use. Short term treatments focus on pain relief and preventing further tissue damage. Historically, aspirin has been recommended. However, studies have suggested prostacyclin (iloprost) is superior for pain relief and healing. In one study, only 6% of patients taking prostacyclin required amputations compared to 18% of those taking aspirin.

Other treatment methods include the use of anticoagulants, prostaglandin, intravenous (IV) vasodilator therapy, and hyperbaric oxygen therapy. In some cases, surgical measures such as distal vein bypass for limb salvage or amputation of the necrotic area is required.
