= List of Alternaria species =

This is a list of the fungus species in the genus Alternaria. Many are plant pathogens. As of 5 August 2023, the GBIF lists up to 602 species, while Species Fungorum lists about 636 species.

== A ==
- Alternaria abietis Tengwall (1924)
- Alternaria abundans (E.G. Simmons) Woudenb. & Crous (2013)
- Alternaria abutilonis (Speg.) Schwarze (1917)
- Alternaria acalyphae (Nelen) E.G. Simmons (1994)
- Alternaria acalyphicola E.G. Simmons (1994)
- Alternaria achyranthis J.Z. Zhang & T.Y. Zhang (1999)
- Alternaria aconidiophora Iturrieta-González, Dania García & Gené (2019)
- Alternaria actinophylla J.W. Mill. (1969)
- Alternaria africana E.G. Simmons (2000)
- Alternaria agerati Sawada ex E.G. Simmons (1997)
- Alternaria agripestis E.G. Simmons & K. Mort. (1994)
- Alternaria ailanthi T.Y. Zhang & Y.L. Guo (1998)
- Alternaria albiziae J.M. Yen (1980)
- Alternaria aliena E.G. Simmons (1993)
- Alternaria allii Nolla (1927)
- Alternaria allii-tuberosi (X.G. Zhang & T.Y. Zhang) Gannibal & D.P. Lawr. (2018)
- Alternaria alocasiae T.Y. Zhang & M.X. Gao (1999)
- Alternaria alstroemeriae E.G. Simmons & C.F. Hill (2007)
- Alternaria altccampina Iturrieta-González, Dania García & Gené (2019)
- Alternaria alternantherae Holcomb & Antonop. (1976)
- Alternaria alternariacida Woudenb. & Crous (2014)
- Alternaria alternariae (Cooke) Woudenb. & Crous (2013)
- Alternaria alternarina E.G. Simmons (2007)
- Alternaria altcernata (Fr.) Keissl. (1912)
- Alternaria amaranthi (Peck) J.M. Hook (1921)
- Alternaria americana Sawada (1931)
- Alternaria ammopiptanthi R.Q. Shen, H.S. Shang & K.C. Wang (2007)
- Alternaria amorphophalli V.G. Rao (1962)
- Alternaria amphicarpaeae Meng Zhang & T.Y. Zhang (2008)
- Alternaria anagallidis A. Raabe (1939)
- Alternaria angustiovoidea E.G. Simmons (1986)
- Alternaria anigozanthi R.D. Raabe (1985)
- Alternaria anodae E.G. Simmons (2003)
- Alternaria anthropophila Iturrieta-González, Gené, Alastr.-Izq. & Dania García (2020)
- Alternaria anthyllidis (Baudyš) Ondřej (1996)
- Alternaria aquaeductua Yatel (1938)
- Alternaria aracearum Smita Jain & A.N. Rai (2004)
- Alternaria arachidis R.L. Kulk. (1974)
- Alternaria aragakii E.G. Simmons (1993)
- Alternaria arborescens E.G. Simmons (1999)
- Alternaria arbusti E.G. Simmons (1993)
- Alternaria arctoseptata J.F. Li, Camporesi, Phookamsak & Jeewon (2023)
- Alternaria argyranthemi E.G. Simmons & C.F. Hill (1997)
- Alternaria argyroxiphii E.G. Simmons & Aragaki (1997)
- Alternaria armeniacae T.Y. Zhang, Meng Zhang & W.H. Yang (2003)
- Alternaria armoraciae E.G. Simmons & C.F. Hill (2007)
- Alternaria arrhenatheri D.P. Lawr., Rotondo & Gannibal (2015)
- Alternaria arundinis J.F. Li, Camporesi, Bhat & Jeewon (2023)
- Alternaria ascaloniae E.G. Simmons & C.F. Hill (2007)
- Alternaria asclepiadea (Cooke) E.G. Simmons (2007)
- Alternaria aspera Woudenb. & Crous (2013)
- Alternaria asphodeli O. Săvul. (1950)
- Alternaria astragali Wangeline & E.G. Simmons (2007)
- Alternaria astragalicola W. Zhao, Q. Ning & J.Y. Yan (2023)
- Alternaria atra (Preuss) Woudenb. & Crous (2013)
- Alternaria atrans F. Gibson (1922)
- Alternaria atrobrunnea Iturrieta-González, Pujol, García & Gené (2020)
- Alternaria atrocariis E.G. Simmons (1995)
- Alternaria avenicola E.G. Simmons, Kosiak & Kwaśna (2007)
- Alternaria avenicola (Kosiak & Kwaśna) P.M. Kirk (2015)
- Alternaria axiaeriisporifera E.G. Simmons & C.F. Hill (2007)
- Alternaria azadirachtae E.G. Simmons & Alcorn (2007)
- Alternaria azukiae (Hara) T.Y. Zhang & Y.L. Guo (1998)

== B ==
- Alternaria bannaensis W.Q. Chen & T.Y. Zhang (1997)
- Alternaria banyan Mall & Aj. Kumar (2013)
- Alternaria baoshanensis J.F. Li, Phookamsak & Jeewon (2023)
- Alternaria barbata L. He & J.X. Deng (2021)
- Alternaria basellae T.Y. Zhang (1999)
- Alternaria bataticola Ikata ex W. Yamam. (1960)
- Alternaria bauhiniae Hansf. (1943)
- Alternaria beringelae E.G. Simmons (2000)
- Alternaria betae-kenyensis E.G. Simmons (2007)
- Alternaria beticola E.G. Simmons & C.F. Hill (2007)
- Alternaria betulae T.Y. Zhang & Y.L. Guo (1998)
- Alternaria biproliformis T.Y. Zhang (1999)
- Alternaria blumeae E.G. Simmons & Sontirat (1997)
- Alternaria bokurai Miura (1928)
- Alternaria bonducellae R. Dubey, S.K. Singh & Kamal (1999)
- Alternaria bornmuelleri (Magnus) Woudenb. & Crous (2013)
- Alternaria botryospora Woudenb. & Crous (2013)
- Alternaria botrytis (Preuss) Woudenb. & Crous (2013)
- Alternaria brasiliensis F.M. Queiroz, M.F.S. Muniz & M. Menezes (2001)
- Alternaria brassicae (Berk.) Sacc. (1880)
- Alternaria brassicae-pekinensis Woudenb. & Crous (2013)
- Alternaria brassicicola (Schwein.) Wiltshire (1947)
- Alternaria brassicinae E.G. Simmons (2007)
- Alternaria bresadolae P. Joly (1964)
- Alternaria breviconidiophora J.F. Li, Camporesi, Phookamsak & Jeewon (2023)
- Alternaria breviramosa Woudenb. & Crous (2013)
- Alternaria brevirostra J.F. Li, Camporesi, Bhat & Jeewon (2023)
- Alternaria breviseptata (Matsush.) de Hoog & Oorschot (1985)
- Alternaria brevispora T.Y. Zhang (1999)
- Alternaria broccoli-italicae E.G. Simmons (2007)
- Alternaria broussonetiae T.Y. Zhang, W.Q. Chen & M.X. Gao (1999)
- Alternaria brunnea T.Y. Zhang (2003)
- Alternaria bryophylli (Sawada) R. Kirschner (2015)
- Alternaria bundelkhandae Smita Jain & A.N. Rai (2004)
- Alternaria burnsii Uppal, Patel & Kamat (1938)

== C ==
- Alternaria caespitosa (de Hoog & C. Rubio) Woudenb. & Crous (2013)
- Alternaria cajani Rak. Kumar, A.N. Rai & K.M. Vyas (1996)
- Alternaria calendulae Ondřej (1974)
- Alternaria californica E.G. Simmons & S.T. Koike (2007)
- Alternaria calycanthi (Cavara) P. Joly (1964)
- Alternaria calycipyricola R.G. Roberts (2007)
- Alternaria camelliae (Cooke & Massee) P. Joly (1964)
- Alternaria cantlous (Yong Wang bis & X.G. Zhang) Woudenb. & Crous (2013)
- Alternaria capsici E.G. Simmons (2000)
- Alternaria capsici-annui Săvul. & Sandu (1935)
- Alternaria cardiospermi Canonaco (1936)
- Alternaria caricae T.Y. Zhang, W.Q. Chen & X.F. Lin (1999)
- Alternaria caricicola Ahmadp. (2019)
- Alternaria caricina Ondřej (1996)
- Alternaria caricis (E.G. Simmons) Woudenb. & Crous (2013)
- Alternaria carolinaeana Unamuno (1941)
- Alternaria carotiincultae E.G. Simmons (1995)
- Alternaria carthami S. Chowdhury (1944)
- Alternaria carthamicola Woudenb. & Crous (2014)
- Alternaria carthami-tinctorii T.Y. Zhang & Y.L. Guo (1998)
- Alternaria cassiae Jurair & A. Khan (1960)
- Alternaria castaneae (X.G. Zhang & T.Y. Zhang) Gannibal & D.P. Lawr. (2018)
- Alternaria catalpae (Ellis & G. Martin) P. Joly (1964)
- Alternaria catananches Woudenb. & Crous (2014)
- Alternaria catharanthi (T.Y. Zhang & X.F. Lin) E.G. Simmons (2007)
- Alternaria catharanthicola T.Y. Zhang (1999)
- Alternaria caudata (Cooke & Ellis) E.G. Simmons (2007)
- Alternaria celosiicola Jun. Nishikawa & C. Nakash. (2013)
- Alternaria centaureae E.G. Simmons (2007)
- Alternaria cepulae Ponnappa & R.S. Deshp. (1974)
- Alternaria cerasi Potebnia (1907)
- Alternaria cerasidanica R.G. Roberts (2010)
- Alternaria cercosporoides Unamuno (1942)
- Alternaria cerealis E.G. Simmons & C.F. Hill (2007)
- Alternaria cesenica Phukhams., Qing Tian, Camporesi & K.D. Hyde (2015)
- Alternaria chartarum Preuss (1851)
- Alternaria cheiranthi (Lib.) P.C. Bolle (1924)
- Alternaria chenopodii A. Raabe (1939)
- Alternaria chenopodiicola T.Y. Zhang, W.Q. Chen & M.X. Gao (1999)
- Alternaria chlamydospora Mouch. (1973)
- Alternaria chlamydosporifera Iturrieta-González, Dania García & Gené (2019)
- Alternaria chlamydosporiformans (B.S. Vieira & R.W. Barreto) P.M. Kirk (2015)
- Alternaria chlamydosporigena Woudenb. & Crous (2013)
- Alternaria ciceris E.G. Simmons (2007)
- Alternaria cichorii Nattrass (1937)
- Alternaria cicina E.G. Simmons (1994)
- Alternaria cinerariae Hori & Enjoji (1931)
- Alternaria cinerea (Baucom & Creamer) Woudenb. & Crous (2013)
- Alternaria cirsinoxia E.G. Simmons & K. Mort. (1997)
- Alternaria citri Ellis & N. Pierce (1902)
- Alternaria citriarbusti E.G. Simmons (1999)
- Alternaria citricancri E.G. Simmons (2007)
- Alternaria citrimacularis E.G. Simmons (1999)
- Alternaria citrullicola Woudenb. & Crous (2014)
- Alternaria clerodendri T.Y. Zhang & J.Z. Zhang (2003)
- Alternaria coicis T.Y. Zhang (2003)
- Alternaria colombiana E.G. Simmons (1999)
- Alternaria compacta (Cooke) McClellan (1944)
- Alternaria concatenata Woudenb. & Crous (2013)
- Alternaria concentrica (G. Winter) P. Joly (1964)
- Alternaria congesta (Bres.) P. Joly (1964)
- Alternaria conidiophora Woudenb. & Crous (2014)
- Alternaria conoidea (E.G. Simmons) D.P. Lawr., Gannibal, Peever & B.M. Pryor (2013)
- Alternaria consortialis (Thüm.) J.W. Groves & S. Hughes (1953)
- Alternaria constricta E.G. Simmons (1994)
- Alternaria cookei (Sacc.) Bremer, Işmen, Karel, Özkan & M. Özkan (1948)
- Alternaria cosmosa Y.L. Li & W.S. Wu (2005)
- Alternaria crassa (Sacc.) Rands (1917)
- Alternaria crassoides (Davis) Gannibal (2018)
- Alternaria crotonicola T.Y. Zhang & J.C. David (1996)
- Alternaria crotonis Kamal, R.P. Singh & P. Kumar (1980)
- Alternaria cryptostegiae Smita Jain & A.N. Rai (2004)
- Alternaria cucumerina (Ellis & Everh.) J.A. Elliott (1917)
- Alternaria cucurbitae Letendre & Roum. (1886)
- Alternaria culmorum (Cooke & Harkn.) P. Joly (1964)
- Alternaria cumini E.G. Simmons (2007)
- Alternaria curvata Iturrieta-González, Dania García & Gené (2019)
- Alternaria cylindrica Jun. Nishikawa & C. Nakash. (2020)
- Alternaria cylindrorostra T.Y. Zhang (2003)
- Alternaria cypericola Ahmadpour, Poursafar & Ghosta (2021)
- Alternaria cyphomandrae E.G. Simmons (2000)

== D ==
- Alternaria dactylidicola Thambug., Camporesi & K.D. Hyde (2017)
- Alternaria danida E.G. Simmons (1997)
- Alternaria daturicola T.Y. Zhang, G.Z. Zhao & Meng Zhang (2003)
- Alternaria dauci (J.G. Kühn) J.W. Groves & Skolko (1944)
- Alternaria daucicaulis E.G. Simmons (2007)
- Alternaria daucicola T.Y. Zhang (2003)
- Alternaria daucifolii E.G. Simmons (2007)
- Alternaria dendropanacis S.H. Yu & J.X. Deng (2015)
- Alternaria dennisii M.B. Ellis (1971)
- Alternaria deserticola Woudenb. & Crous (2014)
- Alternaria destruens E.G. Simmons (1998)
- Alternaria dianthi J.V. Almeida & Sousa da Câmara (1903)
- Alternaria dianthicola Neerg. (1945)
- Alternaria dichondrae Gambogi, Vannacci & Triolo (1975)
- Alternaria didymospora (Munt.-Cvetk.) Woudenb. & Crous (2013)
- Alternaria dioscoreae V.G. Rao (1961)
- Alternaria dissitiflori Meng Zhang & T.Y. Zhang (2007)
- Alternaria divaricatae L. He & J.X. Deng (2021)
- Alternaria diversispora (Thüm.) E.G. Simmons (2007)
- Alternaria dolichi (T.Y. Zhang & G.Z. Zhao) Gannibal (2018)
- Alternaria doliconidium J.F. Li, Camporesi & K.D. Hyde (2018)
- Alternaria dumosa E.G. Simmons (1999)

== E ==
- Alternaria echinaceae E.G. Simmons & C.F. Hill (2007)
- Alternaria eichhorniae Nag Raj & Ponnappa (1970)
- Alternaria elaeagni Vidhyas., Rangan. & Rangaswami (1973)
- Alternaria elegans E.G. Simmons & J.C. David (2000)
- Alternaria eleutherines T.Y. Zhang (1999)
- Alternaria ellipsoidalis J.F. Li, Camporesi, Phookamsak & Jeewon (2023)
- Alternaria ellipsoidea E.G. Simmons (2002)
- Alternaria ellisii Pandotra & Ganguly (1964)
- Alternaria embellisia Woudenb. & Crous (2013)
- Alternaria enydrae S.A. Khan & M. Kamal (1974)
- Alternaria eriobotryae Y.X. Yang, Y. Wang & J.S. Wang (2016)
- Alternaria ershadii A. Poursafar, Ghosta & M. Javan-Nikkhah (2019)
- Alternaria erumpens (Cooke) P. Joly (1964)
- Alternaria eryngii (Pers.) S. Hughes & E.G. Simmons (1958)
- Alternaria erythrinae A. Agostini (1929)
- Alternaria ethzedia E.G. Simmons (1986)
- Alternaria eucalypti (Henn.) P. Joly (1964)
- Alternaria eupatoriicola J.F. Li, Camporesi, Phookamsak & Jeewon (2023)
- Alternaria euphorbiae (Barthol.) Aragaki & J.Y. Uchida (1985)
- Alternaria euphorbiicola E.G. Simmons & Engelhard (1986)
- Alternaria eureka E.G. Simmons (1986)

== F ==
- Alternaria fagaricola (Speg.) P. Joly (1964)
- Alternaria falcata J.F. Li, Camporesi, Phookamsak & Jeewon (2023)
- Alternaria fici Farneti (1903)
- Alternaria ficinae Rak. Kumar, A.N. Rai & K.M. Vyas (1996)
- Alternaria fimeti Iturrieta-González, Dania García & Gené (2019)
- Alternaria floridana (Cooke) E.G. Simmons (2007)
- Alternaria florigena (Ellis & Dearn.) Nelen ex P. Joly (1964)
- Alternaria forlicesenensis Thambug., Camporesi & K.D. Hyde (2017)
- Alternaria forsythiae Harter (1911)
- Alternaria franseriae E.G. Simmons (1997)
- Alternaria frumenti E.G. Simmons & C.F. Hill (2007)
- Alternaria fulva (Baucom & Creamer) Woudenb. & Crous (2013)
- Alternaria fumaginoides Peyronel (1927)
- Alternaria fumosella Cif. (1962)

== G ==
- Alternaria gaisen Nagano ex Bokura (1924)
- Alternaria gansuensis J.Li Liu & Y.Z. Li (2015)
- Alternaria gaurae E.G. Simmons & C.F. Hill (2007)
- Alternaria geniostomatis E.G. Simmons & C.F. Hill (2007)
- Alternaria geophila Dasz. (1912)
- Alternaria geranii Losa (1944)
- Alternaria glyceriae E.G. Simmons & C.F. Hill (2007)
- Alternaria gomphrenae Togashi (1926)
- Alternaria gorakhpurensis R. Dubey, S.K. Singh & Kamal (1999)
- Alternaria gossypii (Jacz.) Y. Nisik., K. Kimura & Miyaw. (1940)
- Alternaria gossypina (Thüm.) J.C.F. Hopkins (1931)
- Alternaria gpagarwalii (Nagaraju, Kunwar, Manohar. & D.K. Agarwal) Gannibal & D.P. Lawr. (2018)
- Alternaria graminicola E.G. Simmons (2007)
- Alternaria graminum P. Joly (1964)
- Alternaria grandis E.G. Simmons (2000)
- Alternaria granulosa (Bubák) E.G. Simmons (1982)
- Alternaria grisea Svilv. (1936)
- Alternaria grossulariae Jacz. (1906)
- Alternaria guangxiensis W.Q. Chen & T.Y. Zhang (1997)
- Alternaria guaranitica (Speg.) E.G. Simmons (2007)
- Alternaria guarroi Iturrieta-González, García, Pujol & Gené (2020)
- Alternaria guilanica Poursafar, Hashemlou, Ghosta, Salimi & Jav.-Nikkh. (2021)
- Alternaria guizhouensis W. Zhao, Q. Ning & J.Y. Yan (2023)
- Alternaria gypsophilae Neerg. (1945)

== H ==
- Alternaria hampshirensis Wanas., E.B.G. Jones & K.D. Hyde (2018)
- Alternaria harzii P. Joly (1964)
- Alternaria hawaiiensis E.G. Simmons (1993)
- Alternaria hederae (J.V. Almeida & Sousa da Câmara) P. Joly (1964)
- Alternaria hedjaroudei Y. Ghosta, Hashemlou, Poursafar & R. Azizi (2020)
- Alternaria helianthicola G.N. Rao & K. Rajagop. (1977)
- Alternaria helianthinficiens E.G. Simmons, Walcz & R.G. Roberts (1986)
- Alternaria heliophytonis E.G. Simmons (2007)
- Alternaria henanensis W. Zhao, Q. Ning & J.Y. Yan (2023)
- Alternaria herbiculinae E.G. Simmons (2007)
- Alternaria herbiphorbicola E.G. Simmons (2007)
- Alternaria hesperidearum (E. Pantan.) E.G. Simmons (1990)
- Alternaria heteroschemos (Fautrey) Gannibal (2018)
- Alternaria heterospora Woudenb. & Crous (2013)
- Alternaria heveae E.G. Simmons (1994)
- Alternaria heyranica Ahmadpour, Poursafar & Ghosta (2021)
- Alternaria hibisci Bouhot ex E.G. Simmons (2007)
- Alternaria hibiscina (Thüm.) E.G. Simmons (2003)
- Alternaria hibiscinficiens E.G. Simmons & C.F. Hill (2003)
- Alternaria hispanica L. He & J.X. Deng (2021)
- Alternaria hispida (Harz) Sacc. (1902)
- Alternaria hominis A. Agostini & Tredici (1937)
- Alternaria hordeiaustralica E.G. Simmons & Alcorn (2007)
- Alternaria hordeicola E.G. Simmons & Kosiak (2007)
- Alternaria hordeiseminis E.G. Simmons & G.F. Laundon (2007)
- Alternaria hortensiae Unamuno ex E.G. Simmons (2007)
- Alternaria humicola Oudem. (1902)
- Alternaria humuli E.G. Simmons (2002)
- Alternaria humuli-scandens Meng Zhang, H.Y. Wu & Dong X. Li (2009)
- Alternaria hungarica B. Tóth, Varga, E.G. Simmons & Samson (2011)
- Alternaria hyacinthi (de Hoog & P.J. Mull. bis) Woudenb. & Crous (2013)
- Alternaria hydrophila Raghv. Singh, Sh. Kumar, Pall. Sharma, K. Shukla, Kamal & D.K. Agarwal (2008)

== I ==
- Alternaria ignobilis (P. Karst.) E.G. Simmons (2007)
- Alternaria impatientis X. Sun & T.Y. Zhang (2005)
- Alternaria incomplexa E.G. Simmons (1996)
- Alternaria inconspicua H.C. Greene (1954)
- Alternaria indefessa (E.G. Simmons) Woudenb. & Crous (2013)
- Alternaria infectoria E.G. Simmons (1986)
- Alternaria inflata Iturrieta-González, Dania García & Gené (2019)
- Alternaria instipitata (Preuss) E.G. Simmons (1995)
- Alternaria intercepta E.G. Simmons (2002)
- Alternaria interna (McAlpine) P. Joly (1964)
- Alternaria interrupta E.G. Simmons (1999)
- Alternaria ipomoeae Truter, Woudenb. & Crous (2014)
- Alternaria iranica E.G. Simmons & Ghosta (2007)
- Alternaria iridiaustralis E.G. Simmons, Alcorn & C.F. Hill (2007)
- Alternaria iridicola (Ellis & Everh.) J.A. Elliott (1917)
- Alternaria italica J.F. LI, Camporesi & K.D. Hyde (2018)

== J ==
- Alternaria jacinthicola Dagno & Jijakli (2011)
- Alternaria japonica Yoshii (1941)
- Alternaria jesenskae Labuda, P. Eliáš & Sterfl. (2008)
- Alternaria junci-acuti Ahmadpour, Poursafar & Ghosta (2021)
- Alternaria juncicola (E.G. Simmons) Gannibal (2018)
- Alternaria junci-glauci P. Joly (1964)
- Alternaria juxtiseptata E.G. Simmons (2002)

== K ==
- Alternaria kamtschatica Gannibal (2018)
- Alternaria kansui T.Y. Zhang & J.Z. Zhang (1999)
- Alternaria kareliniae B. Xu & Z.D. Jiang (2019)
- Alternaria kordkuyana A. Poursafar, Gannibal, Ghosta, Javan-Nikkhah & D.P. Lawrence (2017)
- Alternaria koreana O. Hassan, B.B.N.D. Romain, J.S. Kim & T. Chang (2021)
- Alternaria kulundae Bilanenko, Georgieva & Grum-Grzhim. (2015)

== L ==
- Alternaria lactucae Meng Zhang & T.Y. Zhang (2006)
- Alternaria lactucicola X. Sun & T.Y. Zhang (2007)
- Alternaria lallemantiae (Khokhr.) E.G. Simmons (2007)
- Alternaria lanuginosa (Harz) Sacc. (1886)
- Alternaria lathyri J.F. Li, Camporesi, Phookamsak & Bhat (2023)
- Alternaria latifunda E.G. Simmons (1993)
- Alternaria latispora T.Y. Zhang & Meng Zhang (2003)
- Alternaria lawrencei Iturrieta-González, Dania García & Gené (2019)
- Alternaria leptinellae (E.G. Simmons & C.F. Hill) Woudenb. & Crous (2013)
- Alternaria levis Gambogi ex E.G. Simmons (2007)
- Alternaria ligustici J.Z. Zhang & T.Y. Zhang (2003)
- Alternaria limaciformis E.G. Simmons (1981)
- Alternaria limicola E.G. Simmons & M.E. Palm (1990)
- Alternaria limnanthemicola R.L. Mathur, Agnihotri & Tyagi (1962)
- Alternaria limoniasperae E.G. Simmons (1999)
- Alternaria linariae (Neerg.) E.G. Simmons (2007)
- Alternaria lini P.K. Dey (1933)
- Alternaria linicola J.W. Groves & Skolko (1944)
- Alternaria liriodendri T.Y. Zhang & J.Z. Zhang (1999)
- Alternaria litorea (Pivkin & Zvereva) E.G. Simmons (2007)
- Alternaria lolii (E.G. Simmons & C.F. Hill) Woudenb. & Crous (2013)
- Alternaria loliicola Meng Zhang (2006)
- Alternaria lolii-temulenti A. Agostini (1926)
- Alternaria longipes (Ellis & Everh.) E.W. Mason (1928)
- Alternaria longirostrata T.Y. Zhang & Meng Zhang (2003)
- Alternaria longispora McAlpine (1904)
- Alternaria longissima Deighton & MacGarvie (1968)
- Alternaria loofahae E.G. Simmons & Aragaki (2007)
- Alternaria luffae T.Y. Zhang (1999)
- Alternaria lunariae (Oudem. & C.J.J. Hall) E.G. Simmons (2007)
- Alternaria lungaensis Matsush. (1971)

== M ==
- Alternaria macalpinei E.G. Simmons (1990)
- Alternaria macilenta J.F. Li, Camporesi, Phookamsak & Bhat (2023)
- Alternaria macroconidia J.F. Li, Camporesi, Phookamsak & Jeewon (2023)
- Alternaria macrospora Zimm. (1904)
- Alternaria malayensis Trivedi & C.L. Verma (1970)
- Alternaria mali Roberts (1914)
- Alternaria malorum U. Braun, Crous & Dugan (2003)
- Alternaria malvacearum E.G. Simmons (2003)
- Alternaria malvae Roum. & Letendre (1885)
- Alternaria malvae-vulgaris (A.G. Eliasson) E.G. Simmons (2003)
- Alternaria manihoticola (J.M. Yen) Gannibal & D.P. Lawr. (2018)
- Alternaria manihotis T.Y. Zhang (1999)
- Alternaria manshurica Hara (1936)
- Alternaria maritima G.K. Sutherl. (1916)
- Alternaria martindalei (Ellis & G. Martin) P. Joly (1964)
- Alternaria melongenae Rangaswami & Samb. (1961)
- Alternaria merytae E.G. Simmons (2002)
- Alternaria metachromatica E.G. Simmons (1994)
- Alternaria microspora (Moub. & Abdel-Hafez) Gannibal & D.P. Lawr. (2018)
- Alternaria mimicula E.G. Simmons (1995)
- Alternaria minimispora J.F. Li, Camporesi, Phookamsak & Jeewon (2023)
- Alternaria mirabibensis Crous (2020)
- Alternaria molesta E.G. Simmons (1981)
- Alternaria montanica E.G. Simmons & Robeson (2007)
- Alternaria montsantina Iturrieta-González, Dania García & Gené (2019)
- Alternaria mouchaccae E.G. Simmons (1981)
- Alternaria multiformis (E.G. Simmons) Woudenb. & Crous (2013)
- Alternaria multirostrata E.G. Simmons & C.R. Jacks. (1968)
- Alternaria muriformispora J.F. Li, Camporesi, Phookamsak & Bhat (2022)
- Alternaria murispora Ariyaw. & K.D. Hyde (2015)
- Alternaria mycophila (Bubák & Dearn.) P. Joly (1964)

== N ==
- Alternaria nana T.S. Matvejeva (1951)
- Alternaria napiformis Purkay. & Mallik (1976)
- Alternaria nashi Miura (1925)
- Alternaria nattrassii E.G. Simmons (1997)
- Alternaria neergaardii B.S. Mehrotra & Narain (1969)
- Alternaria negundinicola (Ellis & Barthol.) P. Joly (1964)
- Alternaria nelumbicola T.Y. Zhang (2000)
- Alternaria nelumbii Enlows & F.V. Rand (1921)
- Alternaria neoipomoeae Truter, Woudenb. & Crous (2014)
- Alternaria nepalensis E.G. Simmons (2007)
- Alternaria nerii (Cooke) E.G. Simmons (2007)
- Alternaria nicotiana J.L. Cheng (1997)
- Alternaria nimbyae-dianthi Gannibal (2018)
- Alternaria nimbyoides Gannibal (2018)
- Alternaria nitrimali E.G. Simmons & M.E. Palm (2000)
- Alternaria nobilis (Vize) E.G. Simmons (2002)
- Alternaria nodulariconidiophora J.F. Li, Camporesi, Bhat & Jeewon (2023)
- Alternaria novae-guineensis E.G. Simmons & C.F. Hill (2007)
- Alternaria novae-zelandiae E.G. Simmons (2002)
- Alternaria nucis Moesz (1909)
- Alternaria nyctanthis K.B. Deshp. & Rajd. (1964)

== O ==
- Alternaria obclavata (Crous & U. Braun) Woudenb. & Crous (2013)
- Alternaria obclavoidea E.G. Simmons (1993)
- Alternaria oblongoellipsoidea J.F. Li, Camporesi, Phookamsak & Bhat (2023)
- Alternaria oblongo-obovoidea (X.G. Zhang & T.Y. Zhang) Gannibal & D.P. Lawr. (2018)
- Alternaria obovoidea (E.G. Simmons) Woudenb. & Crous (2013)
- Alternaria obpyriconidia J.F. Li, Camporesi, Phookamsak & Bhat (2022)
- Alternaria obpyriformis T.Y. Zhang (1999)
- Alternaria obtecta E.G. Simmons (1994)
- Alternaria obtusa B.W. Ferreira & R.W. Barreto (2019)
- Alternaria ochroleuca T.S. Matvejeva (1951)
- Alternaria olivacea (Ellis & Everh.) J.M. Hook (1928)
- Alternaria omanensis Al Ghafri, Maharachch., K.D. Hyde & Al-Sadi (2019)
- Alternaria onobrychidis Ranoj. (1914)
- Alternaria oregonensis E.G. Simmons (1994)
- Alternaria ornatissima (Ellis & Barthol.) P. Joly (1964)
- Alternaria orobanches J.F. Li, Camporesi, Phookamsak & Jeewon (2023)
- Alternaria oryzae Hara (1928)
- Alternaria oudemansii (E.G. Simmons) Woudenb. & Crous (2013)
- Alternaria ovoidea J.F. Li, Camporesi, Bhat & Phookamsak (2022)
- Alternaria oxytropis (Q. Wang, Nagao & Kakish.) Woudenb. & Crous (2013)

== P ==
- Alternaria padwickii (Ganguly) M.B. Ellis (1971)
- Alternaria painchiicola C.D. Sharma, A.N. Rai & K.M. Vyas (1996)
- Alternaria palandui Ayyangar (1928)
- Alternaria panax Whetzel (1912)
- Alternaria papavericola Woudenb. & Crous (2013)
- Alternaria papaveris (Bres.) M.B. Ellis (1976)
- Alternaria paragomphrenae Jun. Nishikawa & C. Nakash. (2020)
- Alternaria paralinicola Woudenb. & Crous (2014)
- Alternaria parvicaespitosa Gannibal & D.P. Lawr. (2016)
- Alternaria passiflorae J.H. Simmonds (1938)
- Alternaria passiflorae Sawada (1959)
- Alternaria patula H.C. Wu & W.S. Wu (2005)
- Alternaria peglionii Curzi (1926)
- Alternaria pellucida E.G. Simmons (1990)
- Alternaria penicillata (Corda) Woudenb. & Crous (2013)
- Alternaria peponicola (Rabenh.) E.G. Simmons (1982)
- Alternaria peponis Yatel (1938)
- Alternaria perangusta E.G. Simmons (1999)
- Alternaria perpunctulata (E.G. Simmons) D.P. Lawr., M.S. Park & B.M. Pryor (2012)
- Alternaria petalicolor (Sorokīn) E.G. Simmons (1997)
- Alternaria petasitis M. Kubota, Kishi & Abiko (1999)
- Alternaria petroselini (Neerg.) E.G. Simmons (1976)
- Alternaria petuchovskoi Bilanenko, Georgieva & Grum-Grzhim. (2015)
- Alternaria peucedani S.H. Yu (2014)
- Alternaria pharbiticola X. Sun, Meng Zhang & T.Y. Zhang (2005)
- Alternaria pharbitis T.Y. Zhang & W.Q. Chen (2003)
- Alternaria phaseolicola Yatel (1938)
- Alternaria phaseoli-vulgaris Sawada (1958)
- Alternaria philodendri X.H. Zheng & P.K. Chi (2000)
- Alternaria photistica E.G. Simmons (1986)
- Alternaria phragmiticola J.F. Li, Camporesi, Bhat & Jeewon (2023)
- Alternaria phragmospora Emden (1970)
- Alternaria physalidis H.F. Liu & J.X. Deng (2019)
- Alternaria phytolaccae J.F. Li, Camporesi, Bhat & Jeewon (2023)
- Alternaria pimpriana V.G. Rao (1963)
- Alternaria pipionipisi E.G. Simmons (2007)
- Alternaria planifunda (E.G. Simmons) Woudenb. & Crous (2013)
- Alternaria platycodonis Z.Y. Zhang & H. Zhang (2003)
- Alternaria plumbaginis G.P. Agarwal & N.D. Sharma (1974)
- Alternaria pluriseptata (P. Karst. & Har.) Jørst. (1945)
- Alternaria poaceicola Thambug., Camporesi & K.D. Hyde (2017)
- Alternaria pobletensis Iturrieta-González, Dania García & Gené (2019)
- Alternaria podophylli (Ellis & Everh.) P. Joly (1964)
- Alternaria polianthis Mariappan, K. Babu & T.K. Kandasw. (1977)
- Alternaria polygoni Meng Zhang & T.Y. Zhang (2007)
- Alternaria polymorpha L. Planchon (1900)
- Alternaria polypodii T.G. Major (1922)
- Alternaria polypodiicola Sh. Kumar & Raghv. Singh (2016)
- Alternaria polytricha (Cooke) E.G. Simmons (2000)
- Alternaria pomicola A.S. Horne (1920)
- Alternaria poonensis Ragunath (1963)
- Alternaria populi T.Y. Zhang (2003)
- Alternaria populicola Gannibal & D.P. Lawr. (2018)
- Alternaria porri (Ellis) Cif. (1930)
- Alternaria postmessia E.G. Simmons (2007)
- Alternaria prasonis E.G. Simmons (2007)
- Alternaria pratensis Y.M. Wu & T.Y. Zhang (2009)
- Alternaria preussii Gannibal & D.P. Lawr. (2018)
- Alternaria primulae Sawada (1958)
- Alternaria proteae (E.G. Simmons) Woudenb. & Crous (2013)
- Alternaria protenta E.G. Simmons (1986)
- Alternaria pruni McAlpine (1902)
- Alternaria prunicola Chethana, J.Y. Yan, X.H. Li & K.D. Hyde (2019)
- Alternaria pseudobotrytis Gannibal & D.P. Lawr. (2018)
- Alternaria pseudoeichhorniae Chethana, J.Y. Yan, X.H. Li & K.D. Hyde (2019)
- Alternaria pseudoinfectoria J.F. Li, Camporesi, Bhat & Phookamsak (2022)
- Alternaria pseudorostrata E.G. Simmons (1996)
- Alternaria pseudoventricosa Iturrieta-González, Dania García & Gené (2019)
- Alternaria pulcherrimae T.Y. Zhang & J.C. David (1996)
- Alternaria pulvinifungicola E.G. Simmons (2007)
- Alternaria puttemansii (Henn.) P. Joly (1964)

== Q ==
- Alternaria qualeae Dorn.-Silva & Dianese (2003)
- Alternaria quercicola Woudenb. & Mirab. (2016)
- Alternaria quercus T.Y. Zhang, J.Z. Zhang & W.Q. Chen (1999)

== R ==
- Alternaria radicina Meier, Drechsler & E.D. Eddy (1922)
- Alternaria ramulosa (Sacc.) P. Joly (1964)
- Alternaria ranunculi E.G. Simmons (2007)
- Alternaria raphani J.W. Groves & Skolko (1944)
- Alternaria readeri (G. Winter) Neerg. (1945)
- Alternaria resedae Neerg. (1945)
- Alternaria rhadina E.G. Simmons (1993)
- Alternaria rhapontici (Nelen) Gannibal (2018)
- Alternaria rhaponticicola X. Sun & T.Y. Zhang (2007)
- Alternaria rhizophorae E.G. Simmons (2007)
- Alternaria rhoicola T.Y. Zhang & J.Z. Zhang (1999)
- Alternaria ribis Bubák & Ranoj. (1910)
- Alternaria ricini Sawada (1959)
- Alternaria rosae E.G. Simmons & C.F. Hill (2007)
- Alternaria rosa-sinensis M.X. Gao & T.Y. Zhang (2000)
- Alternaria roseogrisea R.G. Roberts (2008)
- Alternaria rosicola (V.G. Rao) T.Y. Zhang & Y.L. Guo (1998)
- Alternaria rosifolii E.G. Simmons & C.F. Hill (2007)
- Alternaria rostellata E.G. Simmons (1996)
- Alternaria rostroconidia J.F. Li, Camporesi, Bhat & Phookamsak (2022)
- Alternaria rudbeckiae Nelen (1962)
- Alternaria rumicicola R.L. Mathur, Agnihotri & Tyagi (1962)
- Alternaria rumicis Brahmanage, Camporesi & K.D. Hyde (2020)

== S ==
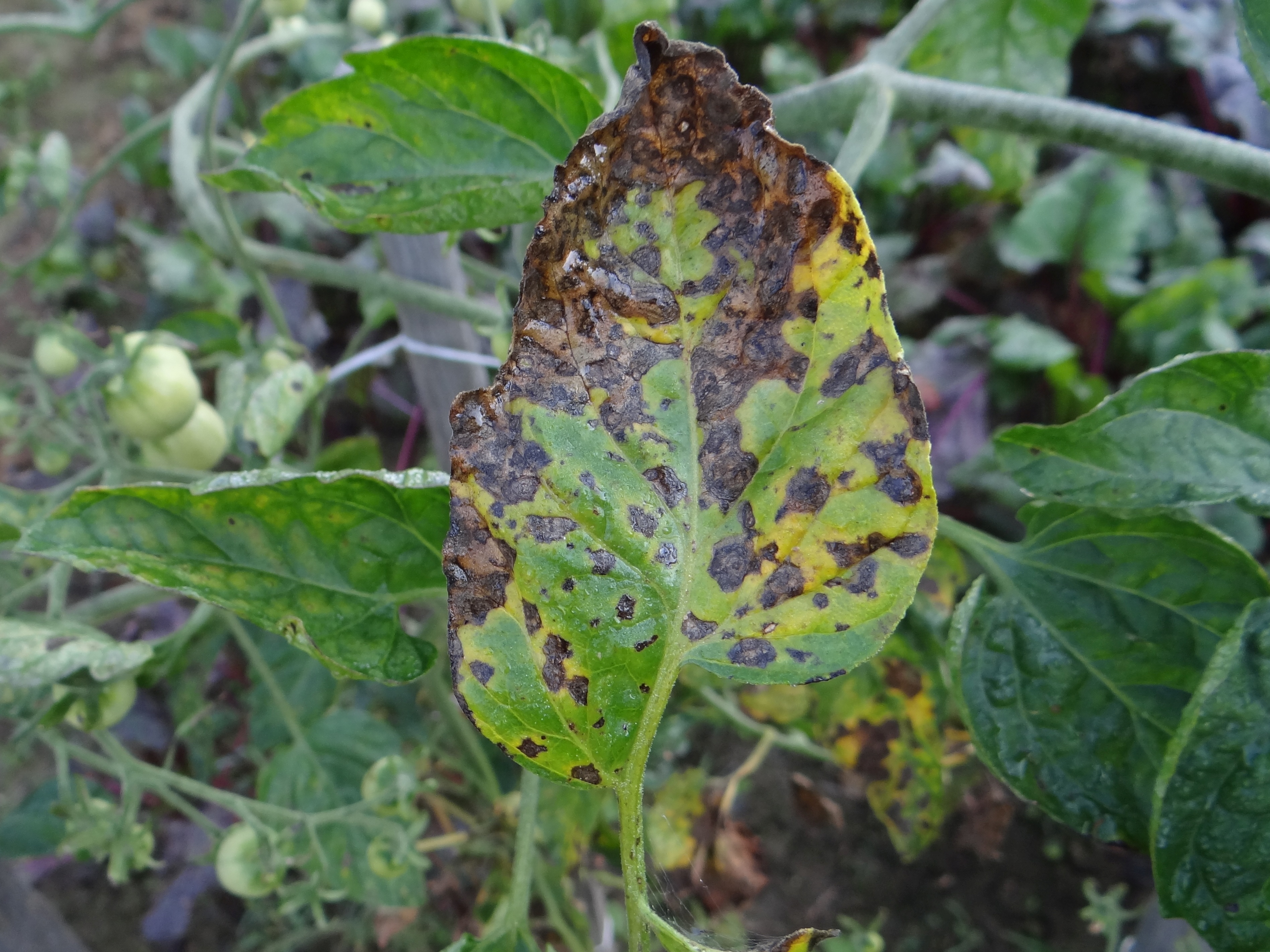
Alternaria solani on a leaf of Solanum lycopersicum (Tomato)

- Alternaria salicicola J.F. Li, Bulgakov & Phookamsak (2023)
- Alternaria salicorniae Riedl & Ershad (1977)
- Alternaria sanguisorbae M.X. Gao & T.Y. Zhang (2000)
- Alternaria saparva (Subram.) Deighton (1969)
- Alternaria sapindi Rajd. (1966)
- Alternaria saponariae (Peck) Neerg. (1938)
- Alternaria saposhnikoviae J.Z. Zhang & T.Y. Zhang (2003)
- Alternaria sauropodis E.G. Simmons (2007)
- Alternaria sauropodis (T.Y. Zhang & J.C. David) P.M. Kirk (2015)
- Alternaria scirpinfestans (E.G. Simmons & D.A. Johnson) Woudenb. & Crous (2013)
- Alternaria scirpivora (E.G. Simmons & D.A. Johnson) Woudenb. & Crous (2013)
- Alternaria scorzonerae (Aderh.) Loer. (1984)
- Alternaria scrophulariae (Desm.) Rossman & Crous (2015)
- Alternaria seleniiphila Wangeline & E.G. Simmons (2007)
- Alternaria selini E.G. Simmons (1995)
- Alternaria senecionicola E.G. Simmons & C.F. Hill (2007)
- Alternaria senecionis Neerg. (1946)
- Alternaria sennae Woudenb. & Crous (2014)
- Alternaria septorioides (Westend.) E.G. Simmons (2007)
- Alternaria septospora (Preuss) Woudenb. & Crous (2013)
- Alternaria sesami (E. Kawam.) Mohanty & Behera (1958)
- Alternaria sesamicola E. Kawam. (1931)
- Alternaria setariae T.Y. Zhang (1999)
- Alternaria shaanxiensis T.Y. Zhang & J.Z. Zhang (1999)
- Alternaria shukurtuzi Bilanenko, Georgieva & Grum-Grzhim. (2015)
- Alternaria sidae E.G. Simmons (2003)
- Alternaria silybi Gannibal (2011)
- Alternaria simmonsii Gannibal (2011)
- Alternaria simsimi E.G. Simmons (2004)
- Alternaria slovaca (Svob.-Pol.) Woudenb. & Crous (2013)
- Alternaria smyrnii (P. Crouan & H. Crouan) E.G. Simmons (1995)
- Alternaria sojae Meng Zhang & T.Y. Zhang (2008)
- Alternaria solani Sorauer (1896)
- Alternaria solani-nigri R. Dubey, S.K. Singh & Kamal (1999)
- Alternaria soliaegyptiaca E.G. Simmons (2007)
- Alternaria soliaridae E.G. Simmons (2007)
- Alternaria solidaccana E.G. Simmons (2007)
- Alternaria somniferi (Har. & Briard) Sawada (1958)
- Alternaria sonchi Davis (1916)
- Alternaria sorghi (X.G. Zhang & T.Y. Zhang) Gannibal & D.P. Lawr. (2018)
- Alternaria sorghicola E.G. Simmons (2007)
- Alternaria spadicea (Thüm.) E.G. Simmons (2003)
- Alternaria stachytarpheticola E.G. Simmons (2007)
- Alternaria steviae Ishiba, T. Yokoy. & Tani (1982)
- Alternaria striiformis (Syd. & P. Syd.) P. Joly (1964)
- Alternaria subcucurbitae (Yong Wang bis & X.G. Zhang) Woudenb. & Crous (2013)
- Alternaria subelliptica E.G. Simmons (2002)
- Alternaria subtropica E.G. Simmons (2000)
- Alternaria subulata E.G. Simmons (1994)
- Alternaria sudanensis E.G. Simmons (2007)
- Alternaria suffruticosae Meng Zhang, Z.S. Chen & T.Y. Zhang (2008)
- Alternaria suffruticosicola Meng Zhang, Z.S. Chen & T.Y. Zhang (2008)
- Alternaria sylvestris Gannibal & D.P. Lawr. (2018)

== T ==
- Alternaria tabacina (Ellis & Everh.) Hori (1903)
- Alternaria tagetica S.K. Shome & Mustafee (1966)
- Alternaria tamaricis T.Y. Zhang (2003)
- Alternaria tamijiana Rajd. (1966)
- Alternaria tangelonis E.G. Simmons (1999)
- Alternaria tellustris (E.G. Simmons) Woudenb. & Crous (2013)
- Alternaria tenuissima (Kunze) Wiltshire (1933)
- Alternaria terricola Woudenb. & Crous (2013)
- Alternaria thalictricola Y.L. Guo (1999)
- Alternaria thalictrigena K. Schub. & Crous (2007)
- Alternaria thalictrina Ondřej (1974)
- Alternaria thlaspis (E.G. Simmons & J.C. David) D.P. Lawr., Rotondo & Gannibal (2015)
- Alternaria thunbergiae E.G. Simmons & Alcorn (2007)
- Alternaria tillandsiae E.G. Simmons & C.F. Hill (2007)
- Alternaria tinosporae E.G. Simmons (2007)
- Alternaria tomaticola E.G. Simmons & Chellemi (2007)
- Alternaria tomato (Cooke) L.R. Jones (1896)
- Alternaria torilis J.F. Li, Camporesi, Bhat & Phookamsak (2022)
- Alternaria toxicogenica E.G. Simmons (1999)
- Alternaria trachelospermi T.Y. Zhang, X.F. Lin & W.Q. Chen (1999)
- Alternaria trachelospermicola (T.Y. Zhang, X.F. Lin & W.Q. Chen) E.G. Simmons (2007)
- Alternaria traversoi Peyronel (1913)
- Alternaria triangularis Jun. Nishikawa & C. Nakash. (2020)
- Alternaria tribuli Meng Zhang & T.Y. Zhang (2008)
- Alternaria triglochinicola Alcorn & S.M. Francis (1993)
- Alternaria triticicola V. Rao (1964)
- Alternaria triticimaculans E.G. Simmons & Perelló (1994)
- Alternaria triticina Prasada & Prabhu (1963)
- Alternaria tropaeoli K.B. Deshp. & Rajd. (1964)
- Alternaria tropaeolicola T.Y. Zhang (2003)
- Alternaria tropica E.G. Simmons (1993)
- Alternaria tuberculata Meng Zhang & T.Y. Zhang (2006)
- Alternaria tumida (E.G. Simmons) Woudenb. & Crous (2013)
- Alternaria turkisafria E.G. Simmons (1999)
- Alternaria typhonii T.Y. Zhang & J.Z. Zhang (1999)

== U ==
- Alternaria ulmi (Fuckel) E.G. Simmons (1995)
- Alternaria umbellifericola Ragunath (1966)
- Alternaria undulata R.G. Roberts (2008)
- Alternaria uredinis (Ellis & Barthol.) E.G. Simmons (2007)

== V ==
- Alternaria vaccariae (Săvul. & Sandu) E.G. Simmons & S.T. Koike (2002)
- Alternaria vaccariicola E.G. Simmons (2007)
- Alternaria vaccinii E.G. Simmons (2007)
- Alternaria vanuatuensis E.G. Simmons & C.F. Hill (2007)
- Alternaria varians L. Planchon (1900)
- Alternaria venezuelensis E.G. Simmons & Rumbos (2007)
- Alternaria ventricosa R.G. Roberts (2007)
- Alternaria viburni E.G. Simmons (2002)
- Alternaria viciae-fabae E.G. Simmons & G.F. Laundon (2007)
- Alternaria viniferae Yong Wang bis, Y.Y. Than, K.D. Hyde & Xing H. Li (2014)
- Alternaria violae L.D. Galloway & Dorsett (1900)
- Alternaria vitis Cavara (1888)
- Alternaria vulgaris L. He & J.X. Deng (2021)

== X ==
- Alternaria xiaochaidanensis D.C. Li & F. Wang (2013)

== Y ==
- Alternaria yali-inficiens R.G. Roberts (2005)
- Alternaria yerbae (Speg.) P. Joly (1964)
- Alternaria yunnanensis Z.Y. Cai, X.Y. Liu, Y.X. Liu & Y.P. Shi (2019)

== Z ==
- Alternaria zantedeschiae (X.G. Zhang & T.Y. Zhang) Gannibal & D.P. Lawr. (2018)
- Alternaria zhengzhouensis T.Y. Zhang (2003)
- Alternaria zinniae M.B. Ellis (1972)
