= Lichtheimiaceae =

Scientific classification
- Kingdom: Fungi
- Division: Mucoromycota
- Class: Mucoromycetes
- Order: Mucorales
- Family: Lichtheimiaceae; Kerst.Hoffm., Walther & K.Voigt (2009)

Type genus
- Lichtheimia Vuill. (1903)

Family of fungi

Lichtheimiaceae is a family of fungi in the order Mucorales. The family was circumscribed in 2013 after a molecular phylogenetic analysis helped delineate a new family structure for the Mucorales.

== Genera ==
- Circinella Tiegh. & G.Le Monn. (1873) – 11 spp.
- Dichotomocladium Benny & R.K.Benj. (1975) – 5 spp.
- Fennellomyces Benny & R.K.Benj. (1975) – 4 spp.
- Lichtheimia Vuill. (1903) – 7 spp.
- Phascolomyces Boedijn ex Benny & R.K.Benj. (1976) – 1 sp.
- Rhizomucor Lucet & Costantin (1900) – 6 spp.
- Thamnostylum Arx & H.P.Upadhyay (1970) – 4 spp.
- Thermomucor Subrahm., B.S.Mehrotra & Thirum. (1977) – 1 sp.
- Zychaea Benny & R.K.Benj. (1975) – 1 sp.
