= List of cineraria diseases =

This is a list of diseases of cineraria (Pericallis × hybrida).

== Bacterial diseases ==
Bacterial diseases
| Crown gall | Agrobacterium tumefaciens |
| Southern wilt | Ralstonia solanacearum = Pseudomonas solanacearum |

== Fungal diseases ==
Fungal diseases
| Alternaria leaf spot | Alternaria cinerariae Alternaria senecionis |
| Black root rot | Thielaviopsis basicola Chalara elegans [synanamorph] |
| Botrytis blight | Botrytis cinerea |
| Downy mildew | Plasmopara halstedii Bremia lactucae |
| Fusarium root and crown rot | Fusarium sp. |
| Phytophthora root and crown rot | Phytophthora cambivora Phytophthora cinnamomi Phytophthora cryptogea Phytophthora parasitica |
| Powdery mildew | Podosphaera pericallidis |
| Pythium root rot | Pythium ultimum |
| Rhizoctonia root and crown rot | Rhizoctonia solani |
| Rust | Coleosporium tussilaginis |
| Verticillium wilt | Verticillium albo-atrum |
| White rust | Pustula obtusata |

== Nematodes, parasitic ==
Nematodes, parasitic
| Foliar nematode | Aphelenchoides ritzemabosi |
| Root-knot nematode | Meloidogyne javanica |

== Viral and viroid diseases ==
Viral and viroid diseases
| Impatiens necrotic spot | genus Tospovirus, Impatiens necrotic spot virus (INSV) |
| Tomato spotted wilt | genus Tospovirus, Tomato spotted wilt virus (TSWV) |

== Phytoplasmal diseases ==
Phytoplasmal diseases
| Aster yellows | Aster yellows phytoplasma |
