= A. dianthi =

A. dianthi may refer to:

- Alternaria dianthi, a plant pathogen
- Anarta dianthi, a moth of the family Noctuidae
