= Alternaria tenuissima =

Scientific classification
- Kingdom: Fungi
- Division: Ascomycota
- Class: Dothideomycetes
- Order: Pleosporales
- Family: Pleosporaceae
- Genus: Alternaria
- Species: A. tenuissima

Binomial name
- Alternaria tenuissima Samuel Paul Wiltshire (1933)

Synonyms
- Helminthosporium tenuissimum Christian Gottfried Daniel Nees von Esenbeck (1817); Macrosporium tenuissimum Christian Gottfried Daniel Nees von Esenbeck and Elias Magnus Fries (1832); Macrosporium maydis Mordecai Cubitt Cooke and Job Bicknell Ellis (1878); Clasterosporium tenuissimum Christian Gottfried Daniel Nees von Esenbeck and Pier Andrea Saccardo (1886)

Species of fungus

Alternaria tenuissima is a saprophytic fungus and opportunistic plant pathogen. It is cosmopolitan in distribution, and can colonize a wide range of plant hosts. Colonies of A. tenuissima produce chains on agar growth media. The fungus often forms concentric ring patterns on infected plant leaves. This species produces the allergen Alt a 1, one of the most important outdoor seasonal fungal allergens associated with allergy and asthma provocation. In rare circumstances, this species is also known to infect immunosuppressed humans and animals.

== Growth and morphology ==
Unlike many other species of Alternaria, the conidiophores of A. tenuissima can develop in darkness after the colony has been exposed to light even very briefly; however its growth is more robust with longer periods of light exposure. After 5–7 days in culture, colonies of A. tenuissima reach a diameter of 5 cm on PCA or V-8 agar (vegetable juice agar). Colonies grown on PCA are brown in colour with a loose, cottony texture and bearing golden-brown conidia in chains. Conidia are on the areas of the colony that receive the most light exposure, forming concentric sporulating rings of uncrowded conidial chains growing from branching hyphae on PCA. Sporulation tends to be much more crowded in colonies grown on V-8 agar. Simple unbranched and branched conidial chains of moderate length as well as solitary conidia are interspersed across the colony especially areas that receive little light.

The light, golden-brown colour of the conidia, and their tendency to taper into long beaks, distinguish A. tenuissima from similar species notably A. alternata which produces dark brown conidia with short beaks. Conidia of A. tenuissima also grow individually or in short chains of 2-5 units, while A. alternata tends to grow in longer chains. Alternaria tenuissima conidia are smooth-walled and have a median and subconstricting transverse septum. Colonies of A. tenuissima on natural substrates (e.g., plant leaves) often develop a concentric, ringed pattern.

== Physiology ==
Alternaria tenuissima is a saprophyte, living on dead matter. It produces the mycotoxins alternariol (AOH), alternariol methyl ester (AME), altenuene (ALT), altertoxin (ATX), and tenuazonic acid (TA), that are variously involved pathogenicity and interference competition. Mycotoxins of this species are optimally produced at 25 °C.

== Habitat and ecology ==
Alternaria tenuissima is a cosmopolitan species, common on an array of various plant hosts in many countries spanning a range of environmental conditions. It often colonizes blueberries, tomatoes, grapevine, and strawberries. It has also been found on several cereal grain species. Optimal growth occurs between 25–30 °C (77–86 °F). Although A. tenuissima is normally an opportunistic pathogen of plants, rare cases of skin infections in immunocompromised people have been reported.

== Medical significance ==
Cutaneous and subcutaneous alternariosis is a skin or tissue infection caused by members of the genus Alternaria, most commonly A. alternata and A. tenuissima. Because of the inability of A. tenuissima to invade healthy host tissue, alternariosis tends to be restricted to people with abrogated cellular immunity and occasionally the elderly. Complication following organ transplantion, Cushing's syndrome and immunosuppressive therapies are some of the typical settings in which alternariosis has been reported. Alternariosis appears on the skin as red pustules that may produce ulcers over time. Alternaria tenuissima is a prolific producer of the allergen Alt a 1. Exposure to this protein can induce an allergic reaction in sensitized individuals by reacting with circulating IgE antibody. Exposure to Alt a 1 has been associated with asthmatic exacerbation. Alternaria tenuissima also produces the mycotoxin tenuazonic acid which has received attention as a candidate antitumor medication.
