= Thamnostylum piriforme =

Scientific classification
- Kingdom: Fungi
- Division: Mucoromycota
- Class: Mucoromycetes
- Order: Mucorales
- Family: Syncephalastraceae
- Genus: Thamnostylum
- Species: T. piriforme

Binomial name
- Thamnostylum piriforme (Bainier) Arx & H.P. Upadhyay, 1970

Synonyms
- Helicostylum piriforme Bainier, 1880

Species of fungus

Thamnostylum piriforme is a species of filamentous fungi from the order Mucorales. It was first described as Helicostylum piriforme in 1880, before being reclassified to its current name in 1970. T. piriforme has been reported to cause superficial mycoses in humans.

== Description ==
Morphologically, T. piriforme produces stolons and rhizoids. Pyriform sporangia are also formed on the ends of circinate stalks.
