= Lichtheimia ramosa =

Scientific classification
- Kingdom: Fungi
- Division: Mucoromycota
- Class: Mucoromycetes
- Order: Mucorales
- Family: Lichtheimiaceae
- Genus: Lichtheimia
- Species: L. ramosa

Binomial name
- Lichtheimia ramosa (Zopf) Vuill. (1903)

Synonyms
- Absidia ramosa (Zopf) Lendn.; Mycocladus ramosus (Zopf) Váňová; Rhizopus ramosus Zopf; Absidia corymbifera var. ramosa (Zopf) Coudert; Mucor ramosus Lindt; Absidia ramosa var. zurcheri Lendn.; Absidia lichtheimii var. zurcheri (Lendn.) Zycha; Absidia ramosa var. rastii Lendn.; Absidia lichtheimii var. rastii (Lendn.) Zycha

Species of fungus

Lichtheimia ramosa is a saprotrophic zygomycete, typically found in soil or dead plant material. It is a thermotolerant fungus that has also been known to act as an opportunistic pathogen—infecting both humans and animals.

== Taxonomy ==
It was previously known as Absidia ramosa, but has been known by its current name since the Absidia and Lichtheimia genera were differentiated from each other. There has also previously been some disagreement in the scientific community over whether L. ramosa and L. corymbifera were distinct species. But L. ramosa was recently established as a distinct species based on genome sequence analysis.

== Description ==
Asexual reproduction of L. ramosa is done by use of sporangiospore-producing sporangia. The sporangiospores are smooth, lightly colored, and bear a long ellipsoid shape. The sporangia are pear shaped and often sport branched sporangiophores. Sexual reproduction in L. ramosa is achieved through zygospores. These zygospores have been found to have equatorial rings with suspensors and bear no appendages.

== Distribution and habitat ==
It is saprotrophic, most commonly found within dead plant material or in the soil. As this species is thermotolerant, with an optimal growth temperature of around 37 °C, it has now been found in a wide range of habitats around the world–including North America, South America, Central Europe, Africa, and India.

== Epidemiology ==
It is an opportunistic pathogen that has been associated with mucormycosis in both humans and animals. Mucormycosis due to L. ramosa typically only presents in severely immunocompromised patients with a wide range of infections being described; including rhinal, cutaneous, rhinocerebral, pulmonary, renal, and disseminated infections. However, there have been some cases of infection among immunocompetent patients, due to soil contamination of a traumatic injury. Amphotericin B is the typical course of treatment for an infection by L. ramosa. But if not identified and treated quickly enough, the infection can be fatal.
