= Circinella =

Scientific classification
- Kingdom: Fungi
- Division: Mucoromycota
- Class: Mucoromycetes
- Order: Mucorales
- Family: Syncephalastraceae
- Genus: Circinella; Tiegh. & G.Le Monn.

Genus of fungi

Circinella is a genus of fungi belonging to the family Syncephalastraceae. It was first described by Philippe Édouard Léon Van Tieghem & (Alexandre Alexis) George Le Monnier in 1873.

The genus has cosmopolitan distribution.

Species:

- Circinella angarensis (Schostak.) Zycha
- Circinella chinensis H.Nagan. & Kojiro, 1942
- Circinella glomerata Tiegh. & G.Le Monn.
