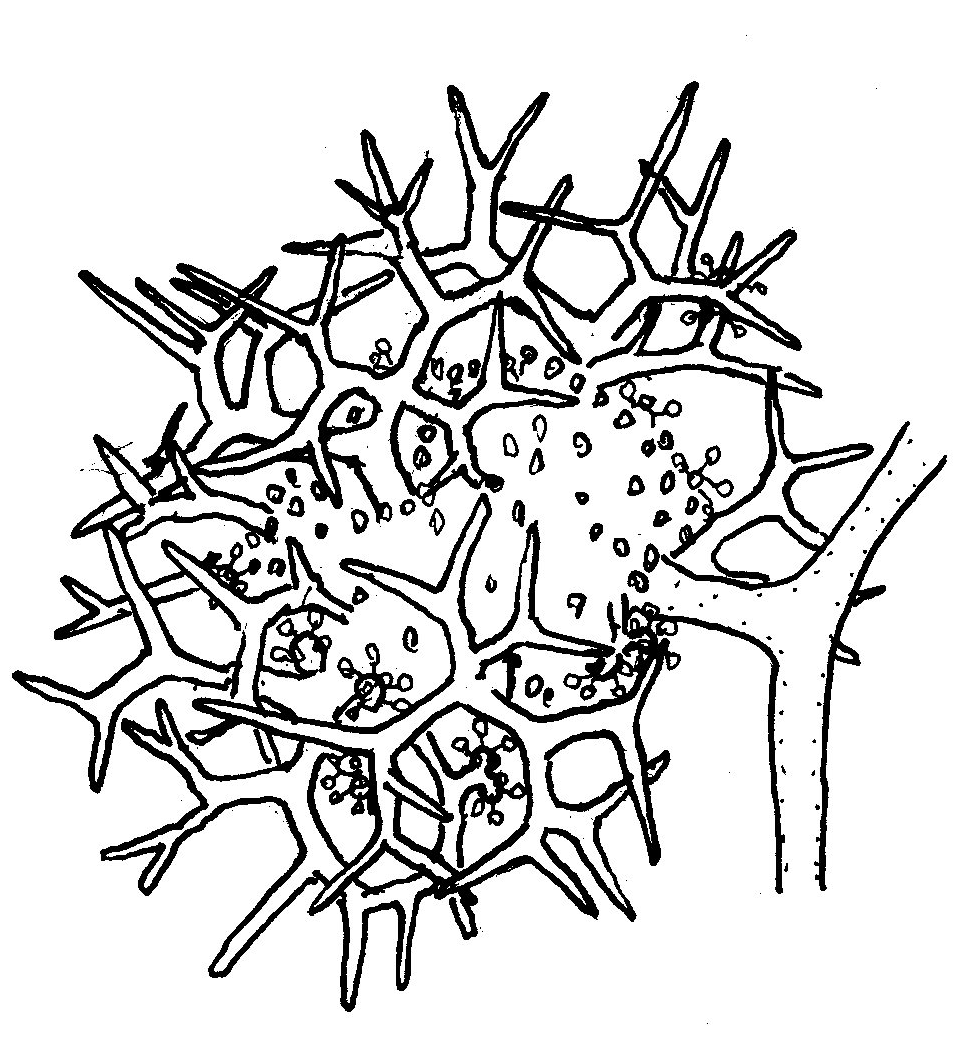
- Dichotomocladium

Scientific classification
- Kingdom: Fungi
- Division: Mucoromycota
- Class: Mucoromycetes
- Order: Mucorales
- Family: Syncephalastraceae
- Genus: Dichotomocladium; G.L.Benny & R.K.Benjamin, 1975

= Dichotomocladium =

Genus of fungi

Dichotomocladium is a genus of fungi belonging to the family Syncephalastraceae.

Species:

- Dichotomocladium elegans Benny & R.K.Benj.
- Dichotomocladium floridanum Benny & R.K.Benj.
- Dichotomocladium hesseltinei (B.S.Mehrotra & A.K.Sarbhoy) Benny & R.K.Benj.
- Dichotomocladium robustum Benny & R.K.Benj.
- Dichotomocladium sphaerosporum R.K.Benj. & Benny
