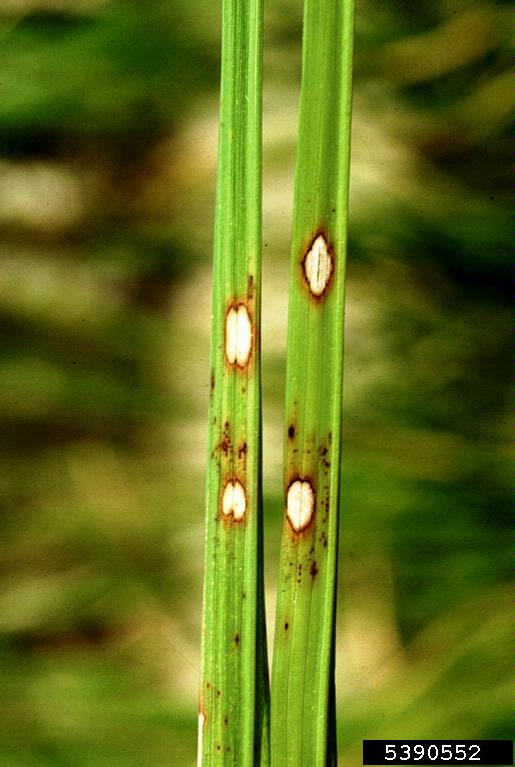
- Rice leaves with stack burn (Alternaria leaf spot) symptoms

Scientific classification
- Kingdom: Fungi
- Division: Ascomycota
- Class: Dothideomycetes
- Order: Pleosporales
- Family: Pleosporaceae
- Genus: Alternaria
- Species: A. padwickii

Binomial name
- Alternaria padwickii (Ganguly) M.B. Ellis, (1971)

Synonyms
- Trichoconiella padwickii (Ganguly) B.L. Jain, (1976); Trichoconis padwickii Ganguly, (1948)

= Alternaria padwickii =

Species of fungus

Alternaria padwickii is a plant pathogen that attacks rice. It is associated with the disease stackburn, otherwise known as alternaria leaf spot.

Rice grown in northeast Argentina commonly suffers from A. padwickii and the particular strains found there are highly resistant to carboxin and moderately resistant to a few other fungicides
