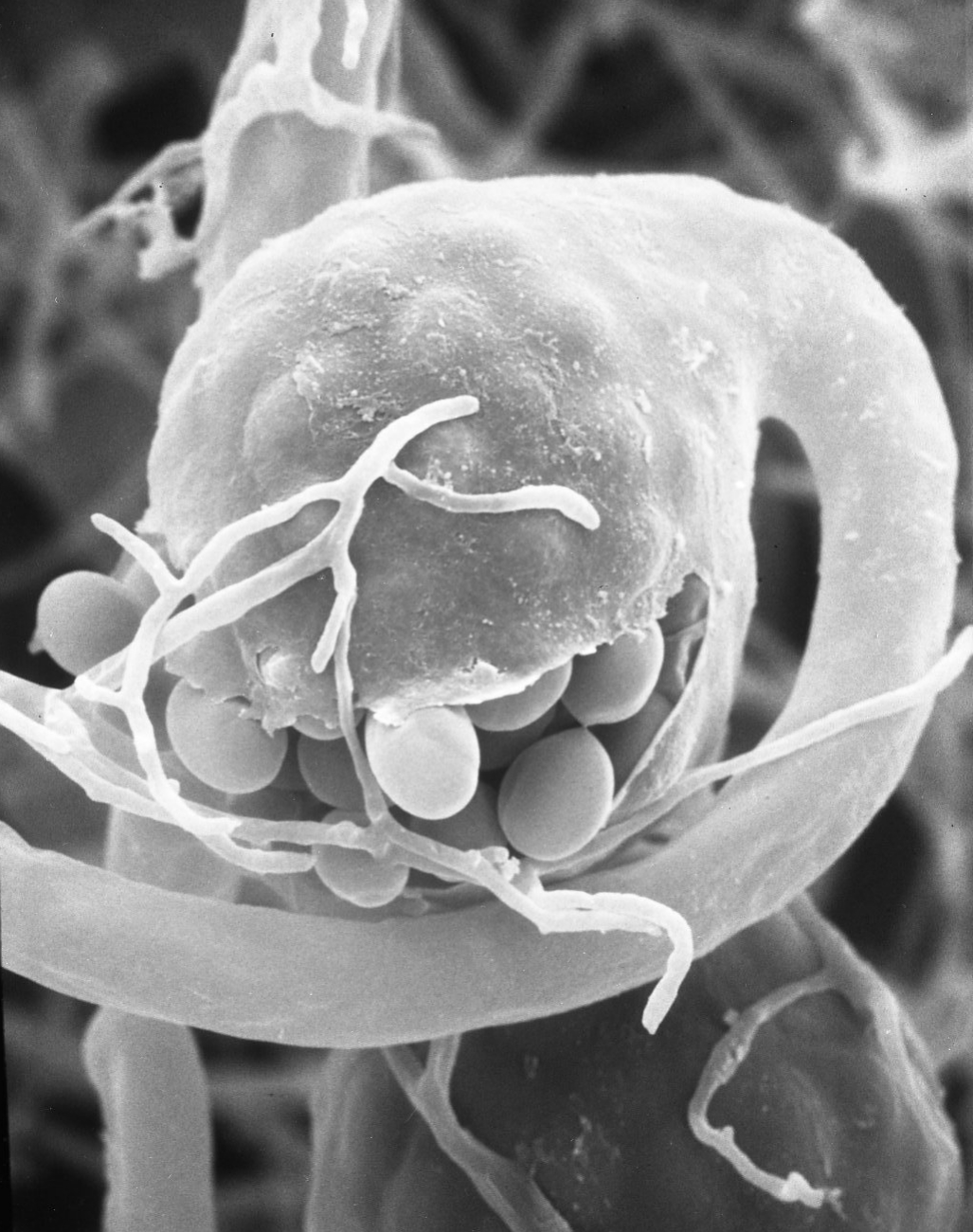
- Fennellomyces linderi

Scientific classification
- Kingdom: Fungi
- Division: Mucoromycota
- Class: Mucoromycetes
- Order: Mucorales
- Family: Syncephalastraceae
- Genus: Fennellomyces; G.L.Benny & R.K.Benjamin, 1975

= Fennellomyces =

Genus of fungi

Fennellomyces is a genus of fungi belonging to the family Syncephalastraceae.

Species:

- Fennellomyces gigacellularis J.H.Mirza, S.M.Khan, S.Begum & Shagufta
- Fennellomyces heterothallicus P.C.Misra, N.N.Gupta & Lata
- Fennellomyces linderi (Hesselt. & Fennell) Benny & R.K.Benj.
- Fennellomyces verticillatus J.H.Mirza, S.M.Khan, S.Begum & Shagufta
