= Tenuazonic acid =

Names
- Preferred IUPAC name (5S)-3-Acetyl-5-[(2S)-butan-2-yl]-4-hydroxy-1,5-dihydro-2H-pyrrol-2-one

Identifiers
CAS Number	610-88-8
3D model (JSmol)	Interactive image
ChEBI	CHEBI:9440
ChEMBL	ChEMBL511015
ChemSpider	19953674
ECHA InfoCard	100.164.201
PubChem CID	101949
UNII	Y2J8Y1TO29
CompTox Dashboard (EPA)	DTXSID701017805
- InChI: InChI=1S/C10H15NO3/c1-4-5(2)8-9(13)7(6(3)12)10(14)11-8/h5,8,13H,4H2,1-3H3,(H,11,14)/t5-,8-/m0/s1 Key: CEIZFXOZIQNICU-XNCJUZBTSA-N
- SMILES: O=C1C(C(C)=O)=C(O)[C@@]([C@H](CC)C)([H])N1

Properties
Chemical formula	C_{10}H_{15}NO_{3}
Molar mass	197.234 g·mol^{−1}
Appearance	White crystalline powder
Acidity (pK_{a})	3.5

Hazards
- Lethal dose or concentration (LD, LC)
LD_{50} (median dose)	* 182 mg kg^{−1} (Mice, ♂, oral): 225 mg kg^{−1} (Mice, ♂, oral); 81 mg kg^{−1} (Mice, ♀, oral)

Pharmacology
Routes of administration	Ingested or Inhaled
- Except where otherwise noted, data are given for materials in their standard state (at 25 °C [77 °F], 100 kPa). verify (what is ?) Infobox references

Tenuazonic acid is a mycotoxin produced by Alternaria species. It is a powerful eukaryotic protein synthesis inhibitor. It is a tetrameric acid that is ubiquitous in biological environments and prevents the release of newly synthesized protein from the ribosome. Its toxicity is the highest among all Alternaria mycotoxins and has both phytotoxic and cytotoxic properties. In 1991 Tenuazonic acid was reported to inhibit skin tumor promotion in mice.

== Inhibitory properties ==
Tenuazonic acid (TeA) is a potent phytotoxin and an effective bio-herbicide due to its ability to block the photosynthetic pathway. It specifically plays an inhibitory role in photosystem II (PSII) by blocking the flow of electrons from Q_{A} to Q_{B}. Studies aimed to determine the exact binding site of TeA in photosystem II found that it binds to the Q_{B} site, preventing Q_{A} from transferring its electrons to Q_{B}. Chlorophyll fluorescence study of the croftonweed plant treated by TeA in vivo show a time dependent increase of reduced Q_{A} as electron transfer is halted. This resulted in decreased photosynthesis in vivo. Tenuazonic acid also resulted in inactivation of PSII Q_{A} and Q_{B} reaction centers. Understanding this inhibitory mechanism of tenuazonic acid in photosynthesis allows for creation of new herbicides which are more targeted and less lethal to the environment.

Tenuazonic acid has been a compound of interest in drug development research for Alzheimer's disease (AD). Several factors contribute to the onset of AD, including low levels of the neurotransmitter acetylcholine (Ach), heightened production of free radicals, and reactive oxygen species (ROS) that cause increased oxidative stress. A drug for AD must target multiple factors of the disease to have a successful therapeutic effect. One study examining six natural compounds determined tenuazonic acid to be a viable compound to treat this multi-factorial disease due to its anti-oxidative and acetylcholinesterase inhibiting properties. Acetylcholinesterase inhibitors (AChEIs) inhibit the breakdown of acetylcholine — allowing for prolonged action of acetylcholine in the nervous system. Tenuazonic acid was also observed to have the ability to chelate heavy metals that directly contribute to increasing oxidative stress.) Five derivatives of tenuazonic acid synthesized and tested for effectiveness in AD treatment showed multi-target activity. Hybrids created using TeA and a known AD drug exhibit even better acetylcholinesterase inhibiting activity.
