= Alternariosis =

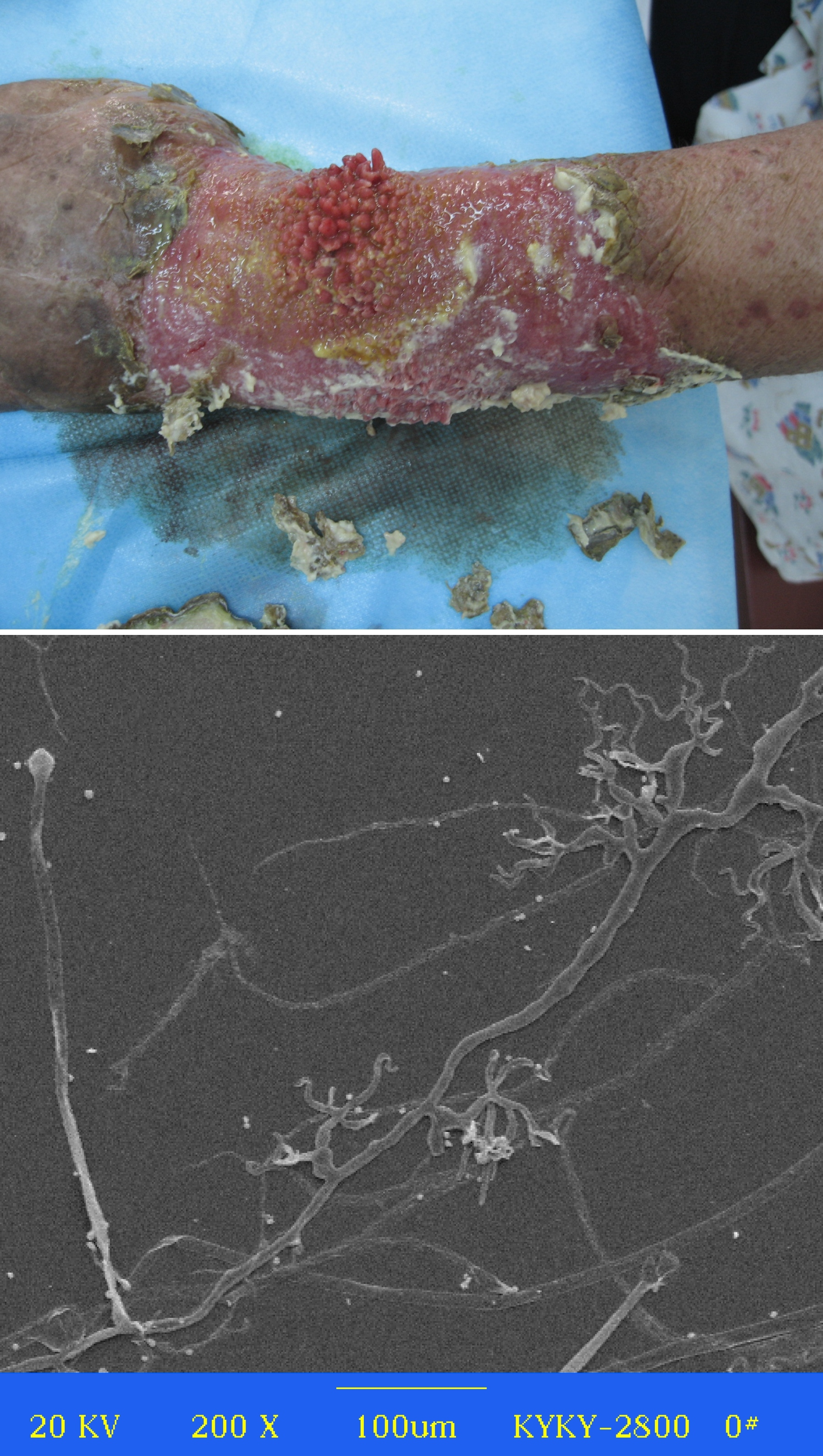
- A 69-year-old female with alternariosis in her left forearm and electron micrograph of her skin showing sporangiophores of Lichtheimia corymbifera.
- Specialty: Dermatology, infectious diseases

Alternariosis is an infection by Alternaria, presenting cutaneously as focal, ulcerated papules and plaques. Treatment with itraconazole has been reported.

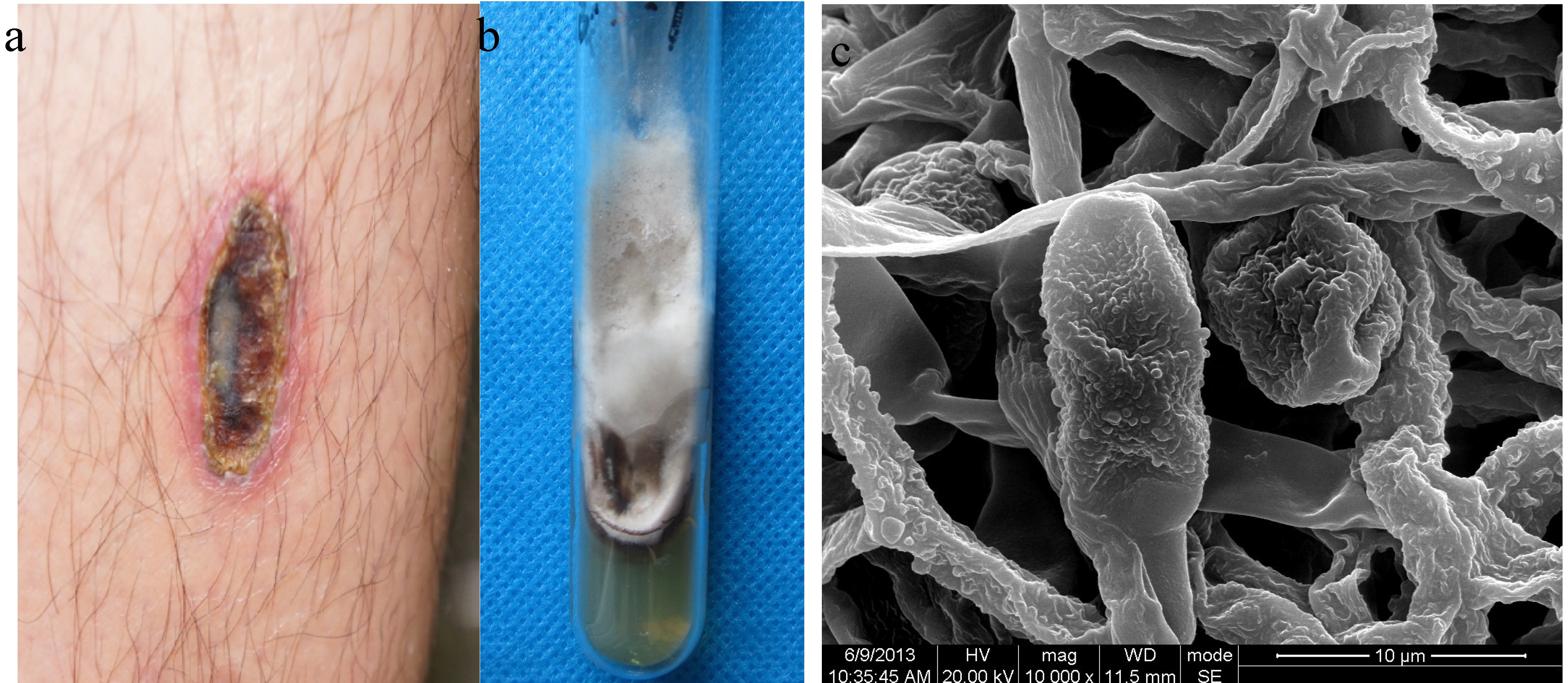
a 28-year-old man with alternariosis caused by Alternaria arborescens

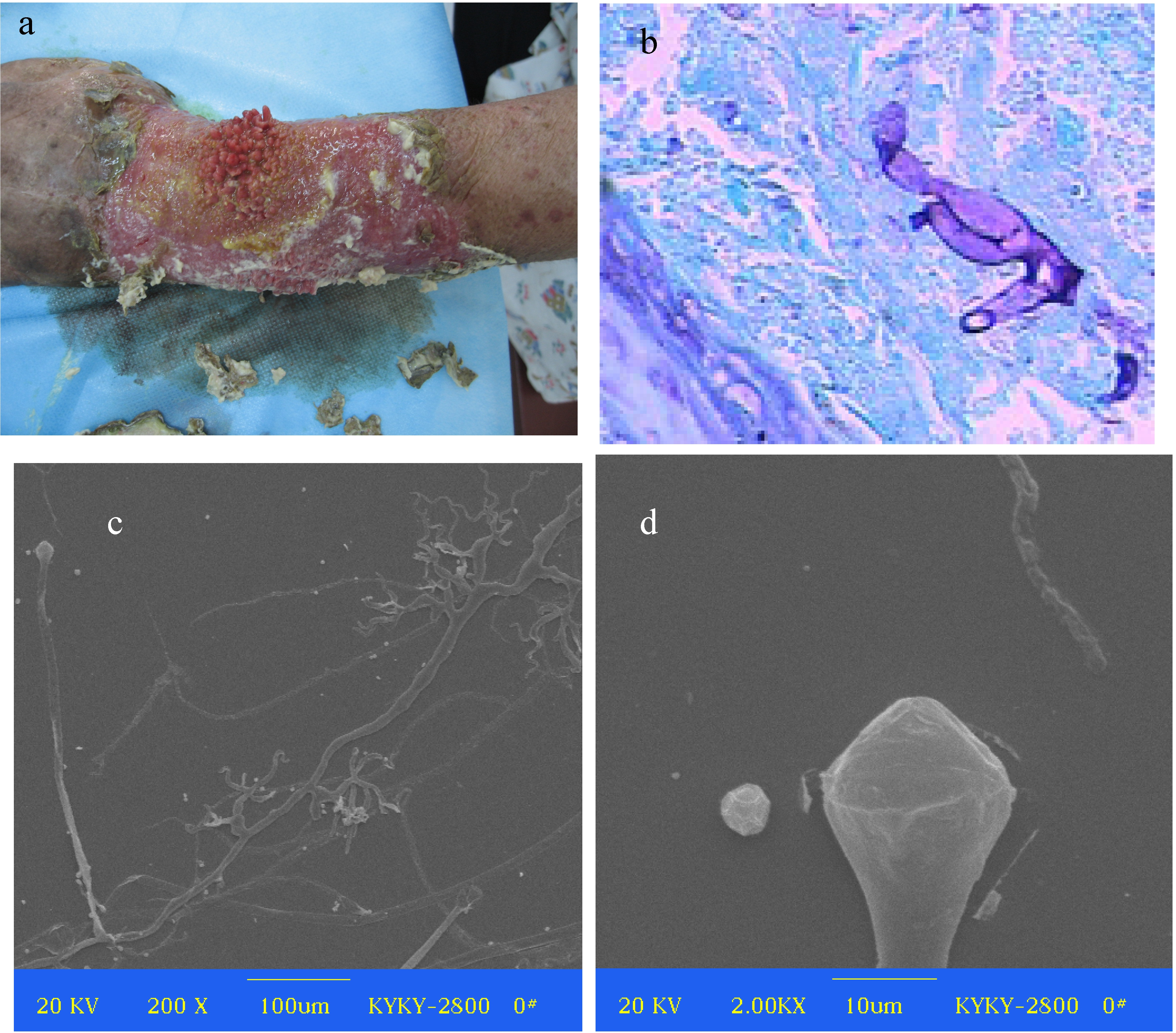

== See also ==
- Skin lesion
