= Alternaria sonchi =

Scientific classification
- Domain: Eukaryota
- Kingdom: Fungi
- Division: Ascomycota
- Class: Dothideomycetes
- Order: Pleosporales
- Family: Pleosporaceae
- Genus: Alternaria
- Species: A. sonchi

Binomial name
- Alternaria sonchi Davis, (1916)

Species of fungus

Alternaria sonchi is a plant pathogen. It was originally found on the leaves of Sonchus asper (a flowering plant) in Wisconsin, USA.
