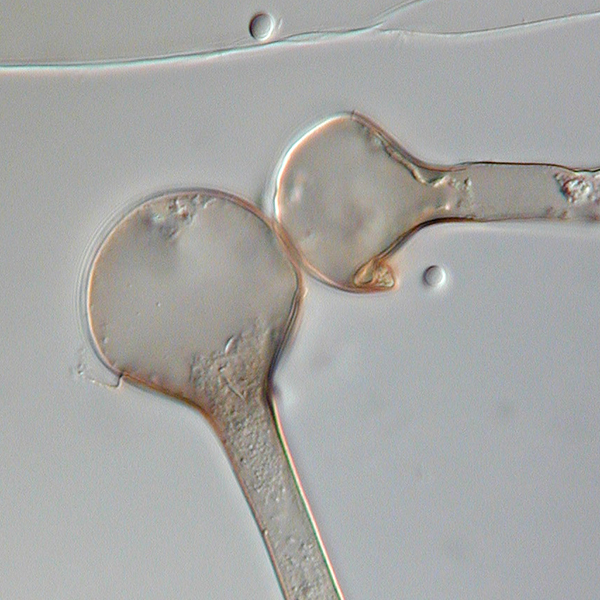

Scientific classification
- Domain: Eukaryota
- Kingdom: Fungi
- Division: Mucoromycota
- Class: Mucoromycetes
- Order: Mucorales
- Family: Lichtheimiaceae
- Genus: Lichtheimia
- Species: L. corymbifera

Binomial name
- Lichtheimia corymbifera (Cohn) Vuill. (1903)

Synonyms
- ≡Mucor corymbifer Cohn ex. Lichtheim (1884) ≡Absidia corymbifera (Cohn) Sacc. & Trotter ≡Mycocladus corymbifer (Cohn) Vánová (1991) =L. hyalospora K. Hoffmann, G.Walther & K.Voigt (2009) =L. sphaerocystis A. Alastruey-Izquierdo & G.Walther(2010) =L. hongkongensis K.Y. Yuen (2010)

= Lichtheimia corymbifera =

Species of fungus

Lichtheimia corymbifera is a thermophilic fungus in the phylum Zygomycota. It normally lives as a saprotrophic mold, but can also be an opportunistic pathogen known to cause pulmonary, CNS, rhinocerebral, or cutaneous infections in animals and humans with impaired immunity.

== Appearance ==
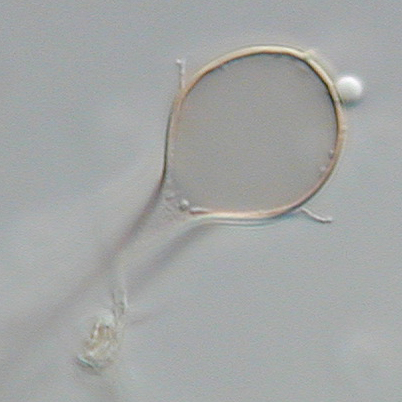
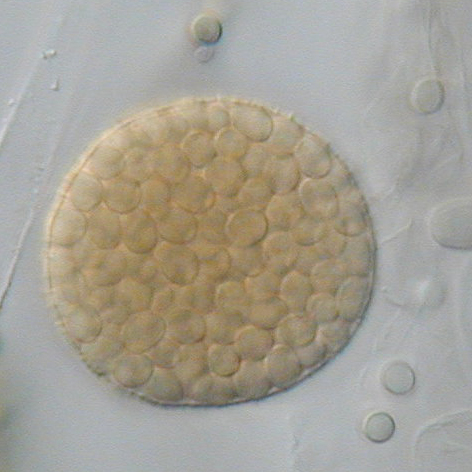
Lichtheimia corymbifera apophysis (left) and sporangium (right).

Lichtheimia corymbifera was originally described as Mucor corymbifer in 1884 by Lichtheim from clinical isolations in Wrocław, Poland. At the time of the description, the species epithet, "corymbifer" was attributed to Cohn. In 1903, the fungus was transferred to the mucoralean genus Lichtheimia (honoring Lichtheim) by Jules Vuillemin as L. corymbifera. In 1912 the species was again transferred by Saccardo and Trotter to the genus Absidia as A. corymbifera where it remained for most of the 20th century. Alastruey-Izquierdo and colleagues in 1991 transferred the species to the genus Mycocladus, described originally by Beauverie in 1900. The type of Mycocladus has since been shown to be a co-culture with elements that appear to be conspecific with Absidia van Tieghem (1876). Thus the oldest available name for the fungus is Lichthemia corymbifera. Although conventionally treated in the family Mucoraceae, the erection of a new family to accommodate the genus Lichtheimia, the "Lichtheimiaceae", has been proposed.

Lichtheimia corymbifera produces small, dark spores inside pear-shaped (pyriform) sporangia. The species is characterized by a conically shaped columella and a short, pronounced projection, a funnel-shaped apophysis, on the top. The sporangiophores (sporangia-bearing stalks) are hyaline to slightly pigmented, sometimes branched, and arising from stolons in groups of three to seven. The zygospores are naked with equatorial rings, have opposed suspensors, and lack appendages. There is limited production of rhizoids, thus, it is often difficult to identify them without the assistance of a dissecting microscope.

Lichtheimia corymbifera produces more compact, less effusive growth than L. ramosa. As well, the sporangiospores of L. corymbifera are ellipsodial and hyaline when mature, versus those of L. ramosa which are lightly colored and ellipsodial.

== Ecology ==
Originally described in Central Europe, the fungus has been found in the Middle East, Great Britain, North and South America, India, and Africa. It is usually found inhabiting soil or dead plant material, and in association with farm animals, such as cattle and horses, probably because it decomposes hay and grass. Infections in farm animals can cause death relatively quickly if not treated immediately. The fungus was described as a cause of mycotic abortion in cattle in Po Valley, Italy.

The natural environment for L. corymbifera appears to be soil and decaying grasses, with an optimal pH between 3.0-8.0. In addition, it has an optimal soil depth of 30–40 cm, according to a study in India. However, they can also be found in the air or underground and can survive on humans and animals, giving it its infectious quality. Furthermore, L. corymbifera can survive well in humid environments, for example, in swamps, dung, grasslands or sewage, in cotton, grains and straw as well. Lichtheimia corymbifera has optimal growth at human body temperature, 35-37 °C; however, due to its thermophilic nature, it can tolerate temperatures up to 50 °C. Lichthemia corymbifera is a fast-growing species in both culture and in vivo. In culture, the fungus is pale white at first and turns grey with age; the colonies are observed to reach up to 15 mm in thickness. The fungus can also be cultured on a range of other materials including bread.

== Epidemiology ==
Lichtheimia corymbifera accounts for approximately 5% of mucormycoses today, but true prevalence is unclear because the disease is not generally reportable and the diagnosis of mucormycosis is often empirical or based on the recovery of any zygomycetous fungus. Infection can occur in people with normal immune systems but contraction is rare if the person is merely in contact with infected soil. On the other hand, infection is common in individuals with weakened immune systems due to diseases like HIV/AIDS. A 100% mortality rate has been reported for individuals with HIV/AIDS who become infected with L. corymbifera. Other immunodeficiency diseases that predispose to infection are diabetes, blood cancers like leukemia or large skin wounds such as those secondary to burn injury. In patients with leukemia, the mortality rate is 1%. In humans, mucormycosis caused by L. corymbifera typically involves deep infection of the rhinocerebral and bronchorespiratory tract. The most common presentation in farm animals is mycotic abortion.

Infection is promoted in immunosuppressed organisms through spore inhalation or direct contact of L. corymbifera spores with tissues. Upon infection, the fungus invades the blood vessels and there is nearby tissue destruction or blood clot formation. Symptoms can be seen in various organ systems. For example, if the abdomen is infected, diagnosis is difficult since it is similar to an abscess presentation. Hence, diagnosis is often only made at death. Diagnosis is also difficult if the lungs are infected. X-rays are often inconclusive in differentiating between other infections. If the sinus/craniofacial area is infected, symptoms begin with facial pain, progressing to muscle or nerve impairment in the eye area, and ultimately leading to the formation of blood clots in arteries serving the brain.

== Treatment ==
Treatment involves a combination of surgical debridement and antifungal therapy. Lichtheimia corymbifera is most susceptible to the antifungal drug Amphotericin B and Posaconazole, however, negative side effects are possible. These side effects can be relatively mild, resulting in chills and muscle pain but can also include severe forms of nephrotoxicity. Amphotericin B binds to ergosterol, found in fungal cell membranes. This causes ion and sugar leakage progressing to cell death. This species is variably susceptible to Itraconazole and highly resistant to Fluconazole, Ketoconazole, Voriconazole and Echinocandins. Higher doses must be administered for these antifungal drugs to be effective. Other species of Lichtheimia are morphologically and genetically distinct but share highly similar antifungal drug susceptibilities.
