= Lichtheimia =

Scientific classification
- Kingdom: Fungi
- Division: Mucoromycota
- Class: Mucoromycetes
- Order: Mucorales
- Family: Lichtheimiaceae
- Genus: Lichtheimia; Vuill.

Genus of fungi

Lichtheimia is a genus of fungi belonging to the family Lichtheimiaceae.

The genus has cosmopolitan distribution.

== Species ==
Species:

- Lichtheimia blakesleeana (Lendn.) Kerst.Hoffm., Walther & K.Voigt
- Lichtheimia brasiliensis A.L.Santiago, N.Lima & R.J.V.Oliveira
- Lichtheimia corymbifera (Cohn) Vuill.
- Lichtheimia ramosa
