= Alternaria arachidis =

Scientific classification
- Kingdom: Fungi
- Division: Ascomycota
- Class: Dothideomycetes
- Order: Pleosporales
- Family: Pleosporaceae
- Genus: Alternaria
- Species: A. arachidis

Binomial name
- Alternaria arachidis R.L.Kulk., (1974)

Species of fungus

Alternaria arachidis is a plant pathogen. Found on the leaves of Arachis hypogaea (the peanut) in India.
