= Thamnostylum =

Scientific classification
- Kingdom: Fungi
- Division: Mucoromycota
- Class: Mucoromycetes
- Order: Mucorales
- Family: Syncephalastraceae
- Genus: Thamnostylum; Arx & Upadhyay, 1970

Genus of fungi

Thamnostylum is a genus of filamentous fungi from the order Mucorales. There are currently four recognized species in the genus. Several members of the genus are known to be pathogenic in humans.

The genus was established in 1970 when several members of the genus Helicostylum were found to be morphological distinct from the type species.

Species:

- Thamnostylum lucknowense
- Thamnostylum nigricans
- Thamnostylum piriforme
- Thamnostylum repens
