= Alternaria raphani =

Scientific classification
- Kingdom: Fungi
- Division: Ascomycota
- Class: Dothideomycetes
- Order: Pleosporales
- Family: Pleosporaceae
- Genus: Alternaria
- Species: A. raphani

Binomial name
- Alternaria raphani J.W. Groves & Skolko (1944)

Species of fungus

Alternaria raphani is a fungal plant pathogen. This species of pathogen causes small dark spots (1-2mm in diameter) on leaves and seed capsules, which grow and turn brown with concentric rings of fungal growth.
