= Alternaria japonica =

Scientific classification
- Kingdom: Fungi
- Division: Ascomycota
- Class: Dothideomycetes
- Order: Pleosporales
- Family: Pleosporaceae
- Genus: Alternaria
- Species: A. japonica

Binomial name
- Alternaria japonica Yoshii, (1941)

Synonyms
- Alternaria mattiolae Neerg., (1945)

Species of fungus

Alternaria japonica is a fungal plant pathogen. It is a cause of black spot disease in cruciferous plants. It is not a major source of crop loss, but is considered dangerous for plants during the seedling stage.

== Symptoms ==
Alternaria japonica affects its hosts in all stages of life. Infection causes a black or grey sunken lesion with a characteristic yellow border. On the leaves of some plants, infection can cause dark, water-soaked spots. The lesions can be observed anywhere on the plant. In seedlings, fungal lesions on the stem are a cause of damping-off. Infected seeds appear black or grey.

== Identification ==
The fungus can first be detected by visually observing symptoms on infected plants. When cultured on potato carrot agar, it will form a grey or brownish, cobweb-like mycelium. Upon microscopic inspection, A. japonica has septate, branched hyphae and appears colorless to greenish grey. Chlamydospores are multicellular with thick, rough walls. Conidia are solitary and beakless. Sequencing of the ribosomal DNA is commonly used for positive identification because the symptoms and microscopic appearance can resemble those of related species.

== Hosts and distribution ==
Transmission of A. japonica occur from infected seeds and plant debris or conidia produced by the fungus in wet conditions. The major hosts of this organism are species in Brassicaceae such as cauliflower, turnip, and cabbage. Whether it can infect species outside of this family is unclear. This fungus is not thought to be a cause of disease in humans, unlike other members of Alternaria. Occurrences of black spot caused by A. japonica have been reported worldwide.

== Management ==
Once A. japonica has been established in an area, it can be difficult to eradicate because it can survive in a dormant state in the soil for years. Prevention of the spread of A. japonica by controlling the transportation of infected plant materials and seeds is crucial. Disinfection of seeds is an effective preventative measure. A variety of chemical fungicides can be used to protect seedlings. Integrated pest management practices such as crop rotation with non-cruciferous plants can be beneficial for farmers dealing with this fungus.
