= Alternaria dianthicola =

Scientific classification
- Kingdom: Fungi
- Division: Ascomycota
- Class: Dothideomycetes
- Order: Pleosporales
- Family: Pleosporaceae
- Genus: Alternaria
- Species: A. dianthicola

Binomial name
- Alternaria dianthicola Neerg. (1945)

Species of fungus

Alternaria dianthicola is a fungal plant pathogen, including Withania somnifera (winter cherry) tree leaves in India.
