= Alternaria helianthicola =

Scientific classification
- Domain: Eukaryota
- Kingdom: Fungi
- Division: Ascomycota
- Class: Dothideomycetes
- Order: Pleosporales
- Family: Pleosporaceae
- Genus: Alternaria
- Species: A. helianthicola

Binomial name
- Alternaria helianthicola G.N.Rao & K.Rajagop. (1977)

Species of fungus

Alternaria helianthicola is a fungal plant pathogen.
