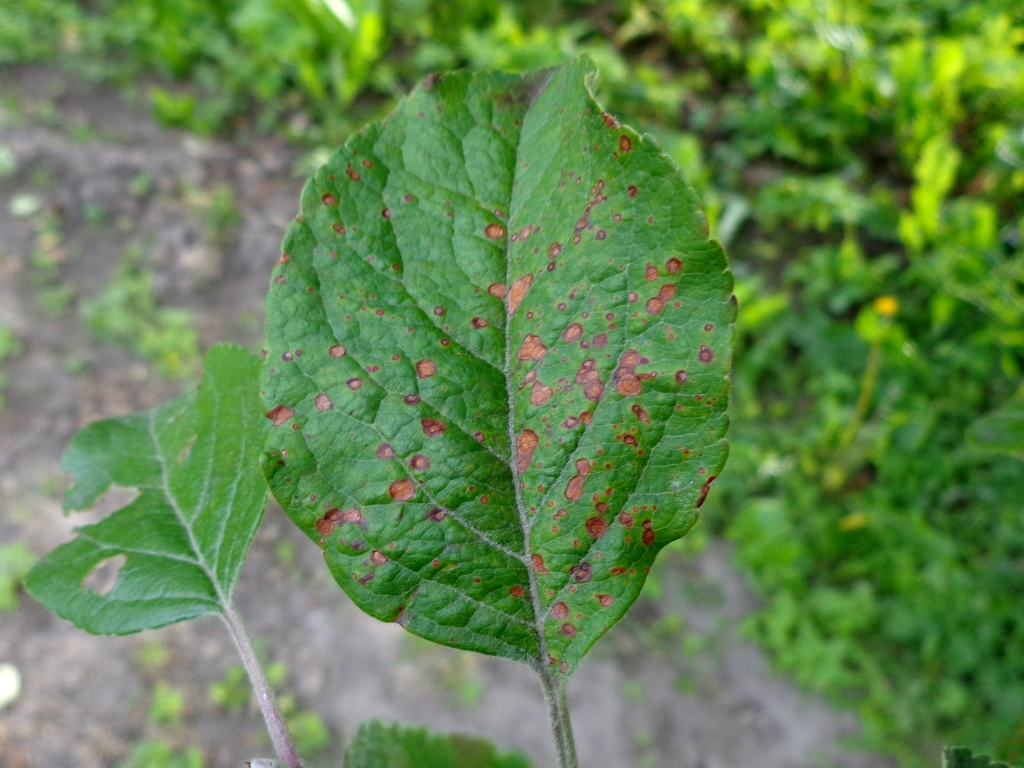
- Alternaria mali infection

Scientific classification
- Kingdom: Fungi
- Division: Ascomycota
- Class: Dothideomycetes
- Order: Pleosporales
- Family: Pleosporaceae
- Genus: Alternaria
- Species: A. mali

Binomial name
- Alternaria mali Roberts (1914)

= Alternaria mali =

Species of fungus

Alternaria mali, also called alternaria blotch of apple, is a pathogenic fungus affecting plants. It is prevalent in the southern United States and elsewhere, and damages the leaves of infected apple trees.

== Pathogenesis ==
Aleternaria mali can overwinter as mycelium on dead leaves on the ground, in mechanical injuries in twigs, or in dormant buds. Primary infection occurs about one month after petal fall the following year. The disease is favoured by temperatures between 77 and 86 °F (25 and 30 °C), and by wet conditions. Infection occurs at optimum temperatures with 5.5 hours of wetting, and an outbreak can become serious within two days of infection. The fungus attacks susceptible cultivars using a chemical toxin. Affected plants exhibit circular spots on the leaves that enlarge as the disease advances. Normally, hyphae cannot adhere to the surface of the host, but under moist conditions light-grey mycelium might be present on the surface. Normally the fungus will not attack fruits except in highly susceptible cultivars; fruit-spotting may occur on the tree or in storage, particularly on fruits with already damaged skin.

== Plant defense ==
Plants' first lines of defense against A. mali infection are the physical barrier provided by the epidermis on the primary body and the periderm on the secondary body. A. mali can still penetrate the stomates and hydathodes of leaves.

As with most pathogens, Alternaria mali resistance involves a gene-for-gene relationship. Apple trees can recognize invading pathogens and mount a defense. Often, the plant may be able to resist the pathogen, even though it has no genetic resistance to same. Apple trees seem to have a weak defense to A. mali, base on the fact that no survivors if leaves has been infected.

== Control ==
Alternaria mali prevention consists of strict quarantine, never importing plants or scions from affected plants and collecting fallen or infected leaves and burning them in winter. Apple cultivars can be ranked in order of increasing resistance as follows: Indo, Red Gold, Raritan, Delicious, Fuji, Golden Delicious, Ralls, Toko, Tsugaru, Mutsu, Jonagold, Jonathan. Chemical control uses fungicides such as iprodione, mancozeb and captan. Disease severity is aggravated by severe mite infestation; thus good mite management is an important factor in preventing severe disease development.
