= Alternaria dauci =

Scientific classification
- Kingdom: Fungi
- Division: Ascomycota
- Class: Dothideomycetes
- Order: Pleosporales
- Family: Pleosporaceae
- Genus: Alternaria
- Species: A. dauci

Binomial name
- Alternaria dauci (J.G. Kühn) J.W. Groves & Skolko, (1944)

Synonyms
- Alternaria brassicae var. dauci (J.G. Kühn) P.C. Bolle, (1924); Alternaria brassicae var. dauci (J.G. Kühn) J. Lindau; Alternaria carotae (Ellis & Langl.) J.A. Stev. & Wellman, (1944); Alternaria porri f.sp. dauci Neerg., (1945); Macrosporium carotae Ellis & Langl., (1890); Macrosporium dauci (J.G. Kühn) Rostr. Polydesmus exitiosus var. dauci J.G. Kühn, (1855)

Species of fungus

Alternaria dauci is a plant pathogen. The English name of the disease it incites is "carrot leaf blight".

== Hosts and symptoms ==
Alternaria Leaf Blight is a foliar disease of carrots caused by the fungus Alternaria dauci. Alternaria dauci is included in the porri species group of Alternaria, which is classified for having large conidium and a long, slender filiform beak. Because many of the members of this group have similar morphology, Alternaria dauci has also been classified as formae specialis of carrots, or A. porri f. sp. dauci. It has been well established that the host range of this disease is on cultivated and wild carrot, but it has also been claimed that Alternaria dauci has the ability to infect wild parsnip, celery, and parsley. A study in 2011 by Boedo et al. evaluated the host range of Alternaria dauci in a controlled environment and concluded that several non-carrot species could constitute alternate hosts, such as Ridolfia segetum (corn parsley) and Caucalis tenet (hedge parsley). Despite their findings, reports of A. dauci colonization on non-carrot hosts continues to be debated because the use of Koch's Postulates on recovered isolates of A. dauci is challenging and is rarely reported; in addition, few reports are often made of such infections in field settings.

Symptoms of A. dauci appear first as greenish-brown, then water-soaked, and finally necrotic lesions 8–10 days following an infection event. These lesions will appear on carrot leaflets and petioles, and have a characteristic chlorotic, yellow halo. The lesions can be irregularly shaped, and will often appear on older leaves first. Older leaves are the most susceptible to infection; when approximately 40% of the leaf surface area has become infected by Alternaria dauci, the leaf will completely yellow, collapse, and die. It is during extended conditions of warm, moist weather that lesions can coalesce and cause entire tops of carrot plants to die off, a phenomenon that is sometimes mistaken for frost damage. The symptoms of this disease are also commonly confused with Cercospora Leaf Blight of carrots as well as bacterial blight, and microscopic analysis is frequently needed to accurately diagnose the pathogen. A. dauci produces characteristically dark to olive-brown hyphae and elongated conidiophores, with conidia typically borne singly. Petiole infection can also occur without any lesion development on leaflets, and A. dauci can additionally result in damping-off of seedlings, seed stalk blight, and inflorescence infections. These symptoms can significantly reduce yield due to lost photosynthetic activity, prevention of mechanical harvest, and infection of commercial carrot seeds.

== Disease cycle ==
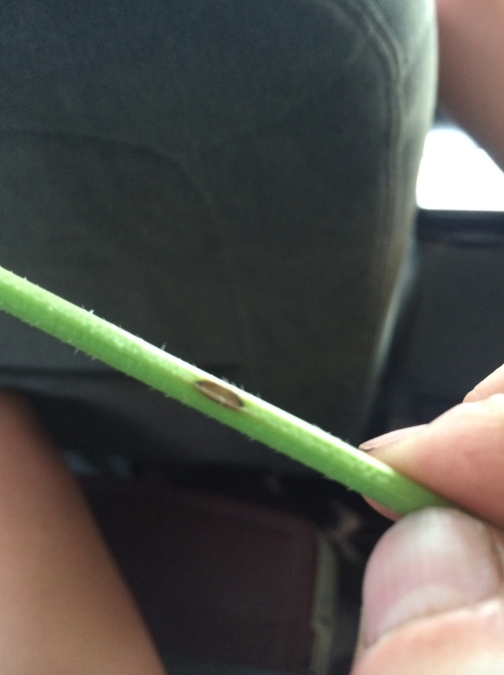
Alternaria dauci lesion

Sexual reproduction of Alternaria dauci is not known to occur, and the disease is most active during spring, summer, and autumn cropping cycles. The disease cycle begins when fungus overwinters on or in host seed and in soil-borne debris from carrot. A. dauci may also be spread into fields via contaminated carrot seeds during cultivation. Once introduced, the pathogen can persist in carrot debris or contaminated seeds in the soil for up to two years. Seedling infection near the hypocotyl-root junction (just below the soil line) then occurs in the early spring following overwintering of Alternaria dauci mycelium or conidia. This infected region will become necrotic and lead to the production of more asexual conidia on conidiophores, which will serve as secondary inoculum. Wind and rain cause conidia to disperse to neighboring host species, and multiple germination tubes will be produced from each conidium that successfully colonizes a new host. As penetration occurs, Alternaria dauci will produce a chemical known as phytotoxin zinniol, which degrades cell membranes and chloroplasts, ultimately leading to the chlorotic symptoms characteristic of the disease. These germination tubes will pierce host cell walls to initiate infection, or if wounds are present the pathogen may enter in that manner. The process of germination, penetration, and symptom development generally occurs in a timespan of 8 to 16 days, but the presence of wounds shortens the amount of time needed to carry out the process.

Following these events, conidia are repeatedly produced from leaf and stem lesions throughout the summer months, allowing the pathogen to be dispersed to its surrounding environment. Inflorescence that is infected by A. dauci early in the summer will produce nonviable seeds, but plants infected later in the summer or early fall may still carry viable seeds; this fungus remains in the pericarp and does not penetrate the embryo or endosperm (non-systemic). Following harvest in the fall, Alternaria dauci will persist in remaining carrot debris in the soil or be concentrated in infected seedlings, and the disease cycle will be repeated.

== Environment ==
Production and transmission of Alternaria dauci is heightened during moderate to warm temperatures and extended periods of leaf wetness due to rainfall, dew, or sprinkler irrigation. Infection can occur between temperatures of 57 - 95 degrees Fahrenheit, with 82 degrees Fahrenheit being optimal. Mycelium and spores are spread through splashing rain, tools for cultivation or contaminated soils. Alternaria diseases, in general, tend to infect older, senescing tissues, and on plants developing under stress. A study conducted by Vital et al. in 1999 assessed the influence of the rate of soil fertilization on the severity of Alternaria Leaf Blight in carrots and found low levels of nitrogen and potassium increased the severity of the pathogen, while high levels of the nutrients reduced disease severity. Though it is not well understood why this occurs, it is postulated that higher nitrogen levels may extend a plant's vigor and delay maturation, which is important because A. dauci is more likely to infect senescing tissue.

== Management ==
Effective management for Alternaria dauci involves preventing the introduction and development of the disease. One of the best practices to avoid infection is to plant pathogen-free seed or seed treated with hot water at 50 degrees Celsius for twenty minutes. In addition to seed treated with fungicide or hot water, once harvest is complete it is imperative to turn the carrot residue under the soil. The pathogen only survives on infected plant debris, allowing this practice to hasten decomposition of the debris. Crop rotation will allow the debris enough time to decompose. Recommendations vary depending on location, but 2 years is the minimum allowance for rotation. Planting carrots continuously in the same field will result in increased infection. New fields should not be located near previously infected fields in order to prevent contamination through dispersal. Dispersal can occur through multiple avenues such as rain splash, farm equipment, workers, and insects.

Cultural practices can also promote reduction of Alternaria dauci. They include practices that will lower the duration of leaf wetness and soil moisture. Planting on raised beds with wider row spacing has been shown to reduce soil moisture, thereby limiting the spread of the disease. Symptoms tend to be more severe on carrots that are stressed or poorly fertilized. In order to avoid more severe symptoms, keep the plants free of injury, watered, and adequately fertilized. Although resistant varieties are not available, the susceptibility of the carrot differs by variety. The varieties least susceptible vary by state, and a list of varieties appropriate to a specific area can be found through the state's extension program. In the Midwest, the University of Wisconsin and the University of Michigan have bred varieties including Atlantis, Beta III, and Chancellor that exhibit resistance.

In the absence of treated seed, there are multiple chemical sprays available to treat Alternaria dauci. Azoxystrobin, chlorothalonil, iprodione, pyraclostrobin and bacillus are a few common fungicides to consider for foliar application. A few brand names to look for in the Midwest include RR Endura 70WG, Rovral, and Switch. Gibberrillic acid has shown to be equally effective as the aforementioned fungicides. However, if sprayed in excess giberrillic acid can defer nutrients from the roots to foliage, resulting in undeveloped carrots. If chemically treating plants, scouting the crop is of utmost importance. Initial threshold recommendations vary depending on location, time of year, and moisture level. Different recommendations include spraying upon first evidence of symptoms or spraying once disease has reached 25% of the foliage

== Importance ==
Alternaria dauci is one of two leading pathogens affecting carrots around the world. Most often found in temperate climates, the disease has been found in North America, the Netherlands, the Middle East, and even parts of Southern Asia and India. Carrot leaf blight is especially damaging in that its leaf lesions not only reduce photosynthetic area, but also weaken the leaves and petioles structurally. This makes mechanical harvesting of the carrot crop less efficient, and yields are even worse when blighted leaves have been exposed to heavy frosts.

Alternaria dauci can spread rapidly if not controlled. Between February and November 2003, when the disease first spread to Turkey, 73-85% of surveyed fields were shown to be infected. Of those fields, disease rates among individual plants ranged from 65-90% total infection within the field. The highest levels of occurrence were always in moist fields with low levels of drainage.

== Pathogenesis ==
Alternaria dauci is most well known for its characteristic dark lesions on the leaves of carrots. These lesions are most often found on mature leaves, where full necrosis often follows. Younger leaves remain, for the most part, relatively unharmed. Immediately after the lesions form on the leaves, chlorosis begins to occur. One phytotoxin in particular, Al toxin, has been shown to both reduce chlorophyll production in leaves as well as cause stunting.

Alternaria dauci first infects its hosts using germ tubes to penetrate the host cell's epidermis. This is done using the phytotoxin zinniol, which is the first toxin produced when the Alternaria conidia germinate in water. Zinniol is highly hydrophobic, and has been detected inside cell walls after infection occurs, so it is assumed that the toxin degrades the cellulose past the epidermal layer. Afterwards, disintegration of neighboring cell walls is seen to occur, as well as breakdown of cytoplasmic structure and complete destruction of chloroplasts. This is followed by a sharp decrease in the availability of polyphenol micronutrients. Polyphenols are important growth and photosynthetic regulators. After only six days of infection, there is almost total loss of photosynthesis on inoculated leaves.
