= Alternaria triticina =

Scientific classification
- Kingdom: Fungi
- Division: Ascomycota
- Class: Dothideomycetes
- Order: Pleosporales
- Family: Pleosporaceae
- Genus: Alternaria
- Species: A. triticina

Binomial name
- Alternaria triticina Prasada & Prabhu (1963)

Fungal disease (leaf blight) of wheat

Alternaria triticina is a fungal plant pathogen that causes leaf blight on wheat. A. triticina is responsible for the largest leaf blight issue in wheat and also causes disease in other major cereal grain crops. It was first identified in India in 1962 and still causes significant yield loss to wheat crops on the Indian subcontinent. The disease is caused by a fungal pathogen and causes necrotic leaf lesions and in severe cases shriveling of the leaves.

== Hosts and symptoms ==
Successful inoculation of A. triticina has been repeatedly confirmed in Triticum turgidum subsp. Durum (durum wheat) and Triticum aestivum (common wheat, bread wheat) with bread wheat varieties showing more severe infection. Barley, sorghum, triticale, oats, rye, and millet have all been experimentally colonized, but field-level infection is restricted to varieties of durum and bread wheat. Infection will only occur on hosts older than three weeks with symptoms appearing at 7–8 weeks of age.

Lesions will start as oval-shaped scars on the lower leaves and infect more leaves as the plant grows. Later in the season, the lesions enlarge and coalesce, becoming darker and forming chlorotic margins around the necrotic lesions. If the infection becomes sufficiently severe and widespread, the entire field will exhibit a burnt appearance. Depending on the initial concentration of inoculum and environmental conditions, infection can spread to the leaf sheath, stem, awns, and glumes. Spike infections lead to infected seed. These seeds may exhibit no symptoms, or they may become brown and shriveled. In either case, they will contain the disease-spreading agent successfully to the next season.

In addition to symptoms derived from nutrient extraction, A. triticina releases several nonspecific toxins, often resulting in chlorotic leaf flag streaks.

Lesions are not easily differentiated from those of other leaf blight pathogens. However, they will have black powder of conidia and not pycnidia or perithecia common to some leaf lesion fungi, which distinguishes it from many ascomycete pathogens of wheat and cereal grains.

== Disease cycle ==
The fungus overwinters largely as seed-born spores. These asexual spores multiply in the soil and transfer primary inoculum to susceptible plant leaves through direct soil contact or by soil that is splashed onto the lowest leaves in rainfall or irrigation. At this point, the polycyclic nature of A. triticina is evident when conidia, the secondary inoculum are produced. Conidia germinate in temperatures between 20 and 25 °C (68 and 77 °F) and with 10 hours of water film on the leaves or 48 hours of humidity greater than 90%. Conidia germinate, producing 2–4 germ tubes, each with an appressorium and penetration peg. Hyphae infect via direct penetration and proliferate inter- and intra-cellularly. Hyphae reach the deep mesophyll tissue within 72 hours of inoculation. Mycelium will spread to the epidermis and parenchyma tissue but not so deep as to infect the vasculature. Leaf tissue thickness becomes greatly reduced and chloroplasts of infected cells grow larger and irregularly shaped. Mycelium will produce conidiophores which extend out of host tissue stomata and bear conidia either singly or in chains. These conidia serve as secondary inoculum for further infections within the season. Lesions appear between 2 and 5 days after inoculation. Infections in the seed head produce spores for the next season. Conidia in leaf and stem tissue can survive in debris, but its viability is greatly reduced when left on top of the soil surface or in hot, wet environments; their survival is limited to 2 months on the soil surface and 4 months when buried.

== Management ==
The wide array of chemical, cultural, and biological inhibitions of leaf blight of wheat make both conventional and organic management reliable and economic. Infection of wheat and other cereal varieties can be prevented with the selection of resistant cultivar and planting of clean, disease-free seed. Seeds can also be treated with chemical agents or with hot water treatments. Biological methods, such as soil treatments of Bacillus spp. or fluorescent pseudomonads have proven effective. The fungi Trichoderma viride, T. harzianum and Pseudomonas fluorescens all exhibit antagonistic growth against A. triticina hyphae in vitro and led to significantly higher yields in treated versus control plants infected with the leaf blight.

Once infection is detected, foliar fungicides, such as mancozeb, ziram, copper oxychloride, and propineb, can prevent further infection from secondary inoculum. One common recommendation for control in India is 2 applications of copperoxychloride + Mancozeb 15 days apart. If overwintering of plant debris conidia is a concern, leaving residues on the soil surface is recommended, as burying of residue increases its likelihood of survival to the next season. Delaying tillage for several months can also help with plant debris inoculum.

== Importance ==
Leaf blight of wheat via Alternaria triticina is “one of the most important foliar diseases of wheat in India”. As the world's second largest producer of wheat, trailing only China, India produces 8.7% of the world wheat supply and dedicates 13% of cultivated land to wheat production. With production levels so important to the agriculture sector of India, leaf blight of wheat is a major concern for growers and other stakeholders. Infection can lead to a 46–75% weight reduction of individual grains with yield losses reaching 60%. In the 1960s, India saw widespread, heavy wheat yield losses due to A. triticina with the introduction of a popular Mexican rust-resistant wheat variety. It is not uncommon to see yield losses of 20% attributed to Alternaria leaf blight of wheat.

The Australian Industry Biosecurity plan for the Grains Industry rated A. triticina a risk rating of HIGH for the years 2004 and 2009 and thus they have created a contingency plan for the containment of the disease. The fungus is a quarantine pathogen and has prompted New Zealand, Brazil, and South Africa to impose regulations on the importation of wheat, requiring freedom statements from the area before reaccepting imports. A. triticina has been found in Argentina, southern Italy, parts of southwestern Asia, North Africa, Greece, the Middle East, and several other eastern European countries.
