= Alternaria cucumerina =

Scientific classification
- Kingdom: Fungi
- Division: Ascomycota
- Class: Dothideomycetes
- Order: Pleosporales
- Family: Pleosporaceae
- Genus: Alternaria
- Species: A. cucumerina

Binomial name
- Alternaria cucumerina (Ellis & Everh.) J.A. Elliott (1917)

Synonyms
- Alternaria brassicae f. nigrescens Peglion (1892); Alternaria brassicae var. nigrescens Peglion, Sacc. & Traverso (1910); Alternaria cyamopsidis Rangaswami & A.V. Rao (1957); Alternaria cucumerina var. cyamopsidis (Rangaswami & A.V. Rao) E.G. Simmons (1966); Alternaria nigrescens (Peglion) Neerg. (1945); Macrosporium cucumerinum Ellis & Everh. (1895)

Species of fungus

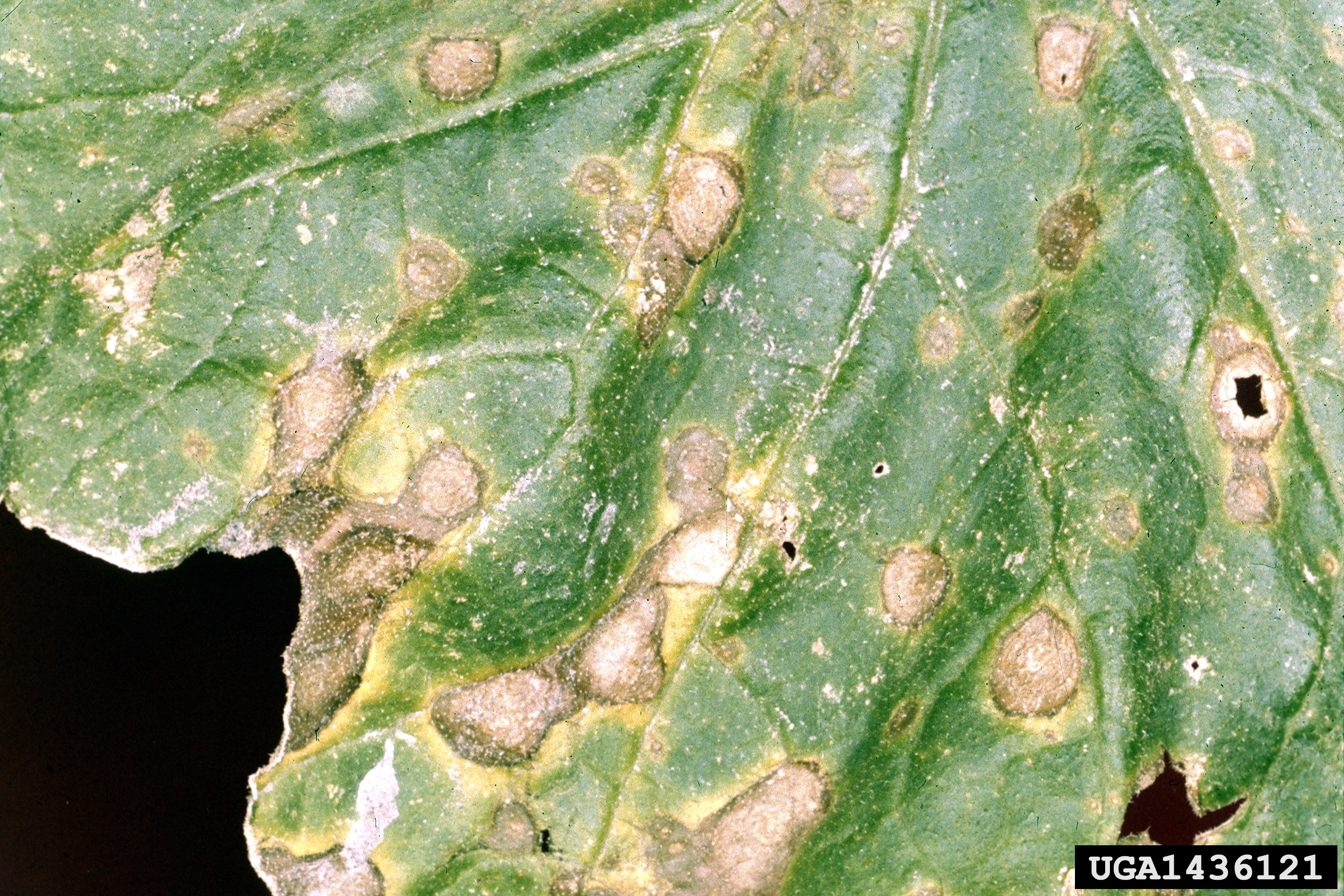
Alternation leaf blight symptoms on a melon leaf.

Alternaria cucumerina is a fungal plant pathogen.
