= Alternaria allii =

Scientific classification
- Domain: Eukaryota
- Kingdom: Fungi
- Division: Ascomycota
- Class: Dothideomycetes
- Order: Pleosporales
- Family: Pleosporaceae
- Genus: Alternaria
- Species: A. allii

Binomial name
- Alternaria allii Nolla, (1927)

Species of fungus

Alternaria allii is a fungal pathogen on leaves of Allium cepa in Puerto Rico.
