= Alternaria saponariae =

Scientific classification
- Kingdom: Fungi
- Division: Ascomycota
- Class: Dothideomycetes
- Order: Pleosporales
- Family: Pleosporaceae
- Genus: Alternaria
- Species: A. saponariae

Binomial name
- Alternaria saponariae (Peck) Neerg. (1938)

Synonyms
- Macrosporium saponariae Peck, Ann. Rep. N.Y. St. Mus. nat. Hist. 28: 62 (1876)

Species of fungus

Alternaria saponariae is a fungal plant pathogen.
