= Alternaria limicola =

Scientific classification
- Domain: Eukaryota
- Kingdom: Fungi
- Division: Ascomycota
- Class: Dothideomycetes
- Order: Pleosporales
- Family: Pleosporaceae
- Genus: Alternaria
- Species: A. limicola

Binomial name
- Alternaria limicola E.G.Simmons & M.E.Palm (1990)

Species of fungus

Alternaria limicola is a plant pathogen affecting citruses. It is the cause of the Mancha foliar de los citricos disease.

== See also ==
- List of citrus diseases
