= Alternaria zinniae =

Scientific classification
- Domain: Eukaryota
- Kingdom: Fungi
- Division: Ascomycota
- Class: Dothideomycetes
- Order: Pleosporales
- Family: Pleosporaceae
- Genus: Alternaria
- Species: A. zinniae

Binomial name
- Alternaria zinniae M.B.Ellis (1972)

Species of fungus

Alternaria zinniae is a fungal plant pathogen.
