= Alternaria linicola =

Scientific classification
- Domain: Eukaryota
- Kingdom: Fungi
- Division: Ascomycota
- Class: Dothideomycetes
- Order: Pleosporales
- Family: Pleosporaceae
- Genus: Alternaria
- Species: A. linicola

Binomial name
- Alternaria linicola J.W.Groves & Skolko, (1944)

Species of fungus

Alternaria linicola is a fungal plant pathogen, that affects linseed plants (Linum usitatissimum).
