= Alternaria euphorbiicola =

Scientific classification
- Domain: Eukaryota
- Kingdom: Fungi
- Division: Ascomycota
- Class: Dothideomycetes
- Order: Pleosporales
- Family: Pleosporaceae
- Genus: Alternaria
- Species: A. euphorbiicola

Binomial name
- Alternaria euphorbiicola E.G. Simmons & Engelhard, (1986)

Synonyms
- Alternaria euphorbiae (Barthol.) Aragaki & J.Y. Uchida, (1985); Macrosporium euphorbiae Barthol., (1908); Macrosporium euphorbiae Reichert, (1921)

Species of fungus

Alternaria euphorbiicola is a fungal plant pathogen.
