= Alternaria panax =

Scientific classification
- Domain: Eukaryota
- Kingdom: Fungi
- Division: Ascomycota
- Class: Dothideomycetes
- Order: Pleosporales
- Family: Pleosporaceae
- Genus: Alternaria
- Species: A. panax

Binomial name
- Alternaria panax Whetzel (1912)

Synonyms
- Alternaria araliae H.C. Greene, (1953)

Species of fungus

Alternaria panax is a fungal plant pathogen, which causes Alternaria blight of ginseng.
