= Alternaria senecionis =

Scientific classification
- Domain: Eukaryota
- Kingdom: Fungi
- Division: Ascomycota
- Class: Dothideomycetes
- Order: Pleosporales
- Family: Pleosporaceae
- Genus: Alternaria
- Species: A. senecionis

Binomial name
- Alternaria senecionis Neerg. (1946)

Species of fungus

Alternaria senecionis is a fungal plant pathogen, can cause leaf spot on Cineraria species, such as on Senecio cruentus in Denmark.
