= Alternaria dianthi =

Scientific classification
- Domain: Eukaryota
- Kingdom: Fungi
- Division: Ascomycota
- Class: Dothideomycetes
- Order: Pleosporales
- Family: Pleosporaceae
- Genus: Alternaria
- Species: A. dianthi

Binomial name
- Alternaria dianthi F. Stevens & J.G. Hall, (1909)

Synonyms
- Macrosporium dianthi (F. Stevens & J.G. Hall) Bewley, (1923)

Fungal plant pathogen

Alternaria dianthi, sometimes known as carnation blight, is a fungal pathogen of the genus Dianthus. Alternaria dianthi infections begin as small circular or ovular spots on leaves and stems, which can be red, purple, brown, yellow or gray.

This pathogen has been found in carnation and other Dianthus cultures worldwide, including in India, the United States, New Zealand, the Canary Islands, and Egypt. Fourteen gene sequences of Alternaria dianthi have been published as of April 11, 2014

== Symptoms ==
Alternaria dianthi can infect healthy plants, and favors humid, warm environments. The multicolored circular spots can grow to infect entire plants, resulting in wilting or death. These spots tend to be smaller than one centimeter, but can be larger, especially around stems. The cankers formed by A. dianthi spread through the stomata of leaf cells, and generally lead to yellowing, wilting, and death of the leaves of infected plants.

== Life cycle ==
Alternaria dianthi reproduces asexually, forming row-like spores off of hyphae. Spores are formed on blisters on the host as well as within the mycelium. The thin, globular spores are spread through water. Spore production and infection decreases over winter, and has been observed to be highest in rainy summer months.

The spores of A. dianthi germinate optimally around 24 °C (75 °F), and cannot germinate below 4 °C (40 °F) or above 32 °C (90 °F). The fungus has been cultured on simple media such as potato dextrose agar, and does not need Dianthus tissue to germinate. Spores come into contact with healthy leaf and stem tissue of Dianthus plants through wind, rain, and contact with infected tissue. The host plant must be wet or moist for spores to germinate. Moderate to high humidity is also a requirement, and one study found that spores would not germinate under 55% humidity. The life cycle takes about four days from germination to the production of new conidia.

Spores produced by Alternaria species are black, and can persist on dead tissue, in soil, and on hard surfaces such as those found in greenhouses.

No observations of pathogens of Alternaria dianthi have been published.

== Impact ==
Alternaria dianthi was first recorded in the scientific literature by F.L. Stevens and J.G. Hall in 1909, from florists in the United States. The fungus, along with other members of the genus Alternaria, is effectively controlled by the commercial fungicide mancozeb, as well as dithiocarbamates, chlorothalonil, and iprodione. Although A. dianthi has been found in wild and commercial varieties of Dianthus plants worldwide, no studies of the economic impacts or losses due to the disease have been published.
