= Alternaria cinerariae =

Scientific classification
- Kingdom: Fungi
- Division: Ascomycota
- Class: Dothideomycetes
- Order: Pleosporales
- Family: Pleosporaceae
- Genus: Alternaria
- Species: A. cinerariae

Binomial name
- Alternaria cinerariae Hori & Enjoji (1931)

Species of fungus

Alternaria cinerariae is a fungal plant pathogen.
