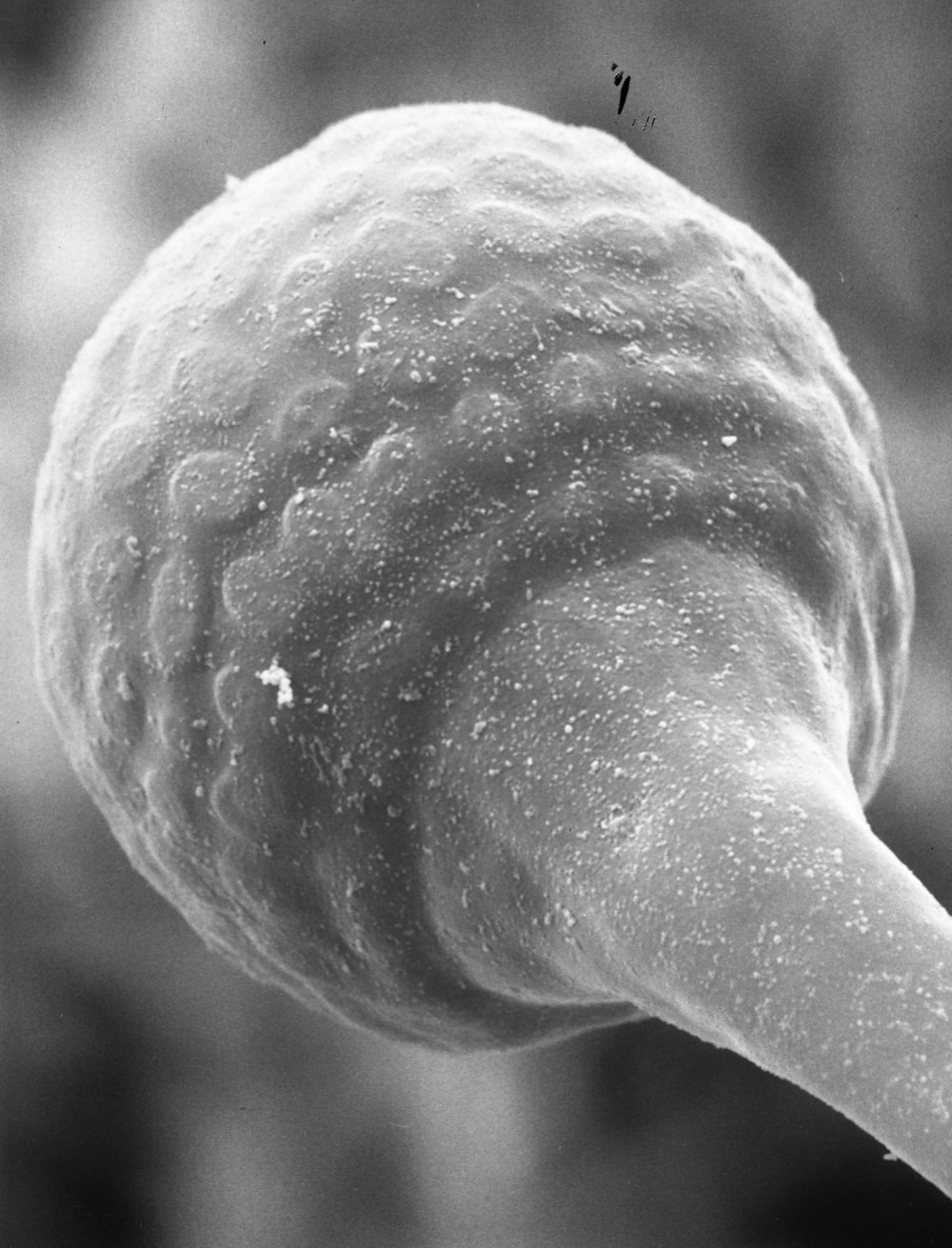
- Fennellomyces linderi

Scientific classification
- Kingdom: Fungi
- Division: Mucoromycota
- Class: Mucoromycetes
- Order: Mucorales
- Family: Syncephalastraceae; Naumov ex R.K. Benj. (1959)

Type genus
- Syncephalastrum J.Schröt. (1892)

= Syncephalastraceae =

Family of fungi

The Syncephalastraceae are a family of fungi in the order Mucorales. Members of this family have a widespread distribution, but are more common in tropical and subtropical regions.

== Description ==
The family is characterized by the presence of merosporangia. Zygospores are warty, and borne on opposed suspensors.
