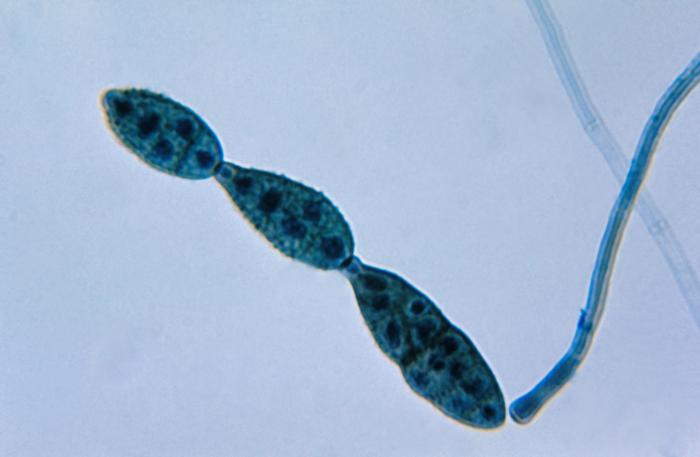

Scientific classification
- Kingdom: Fungi
- Division: Ascomycota
- Class: Dothideomycetes
- Order: Pleosporales
- Family: Pleosporaceae
- Genus: Alternaria; Nees

Species
- Many, see text

= Alternaria =

Genus of fungi

Alternaria is a genus of fungi that are found worldwide. Alternaria species are known as major plant pathogens. They are also common allergens in humans, growing indoors and causing hay fever or hypersensitivity reactions that sometimes lead to asthma. They are present in the human mycobiome and readily cause opportunistic infections in immunocompromised people such as AIDS patients.

There were about 600 known species in the genus in 2023 (although in 2008 the Dictionary of Fungi only listed 299). They are ubiquitous in the environment and are a natural part of funga almost everywhere. They are normal agents of decay and decomposition. The spores are airborne and found in the soil and water, as well as indoors and on objects. The club-shaped spores are single or form long chains. They can grow thick colonies which are usually green, black, or gray.

At least 20% of agricultural spoilage is caused by Alternaria species, with the most severe losses reaching 80% of yield. Many human health disorders can be caused by these fungi, which grow on skin and mucous membranes, including on the eyeballs and within the respiratory tract. Allergies are common, but serious infections are rare, except in people with compromised immune systems. However, species of this fungal genus are often prolific producers of a variety of toxic compounds. The effects most of these compounds have on animal and plant health are not well known. Many species of Alternaria modify their secondary metabolites by sulfoconjugation; however, the role of this process is not yet understood. The terms alternariosis and alternariatoxicosis are used for disorders in humans and animals caused by a fungus in this genus.

Not all Alternaria species are pests and pathogens; some have shown promise as biocontrol agents against invasive plant species. Some species have also been reported as endophytic microorganisms with highly bioactive metabolites.

The genus is now known to be polyphyletic.

== Species ==
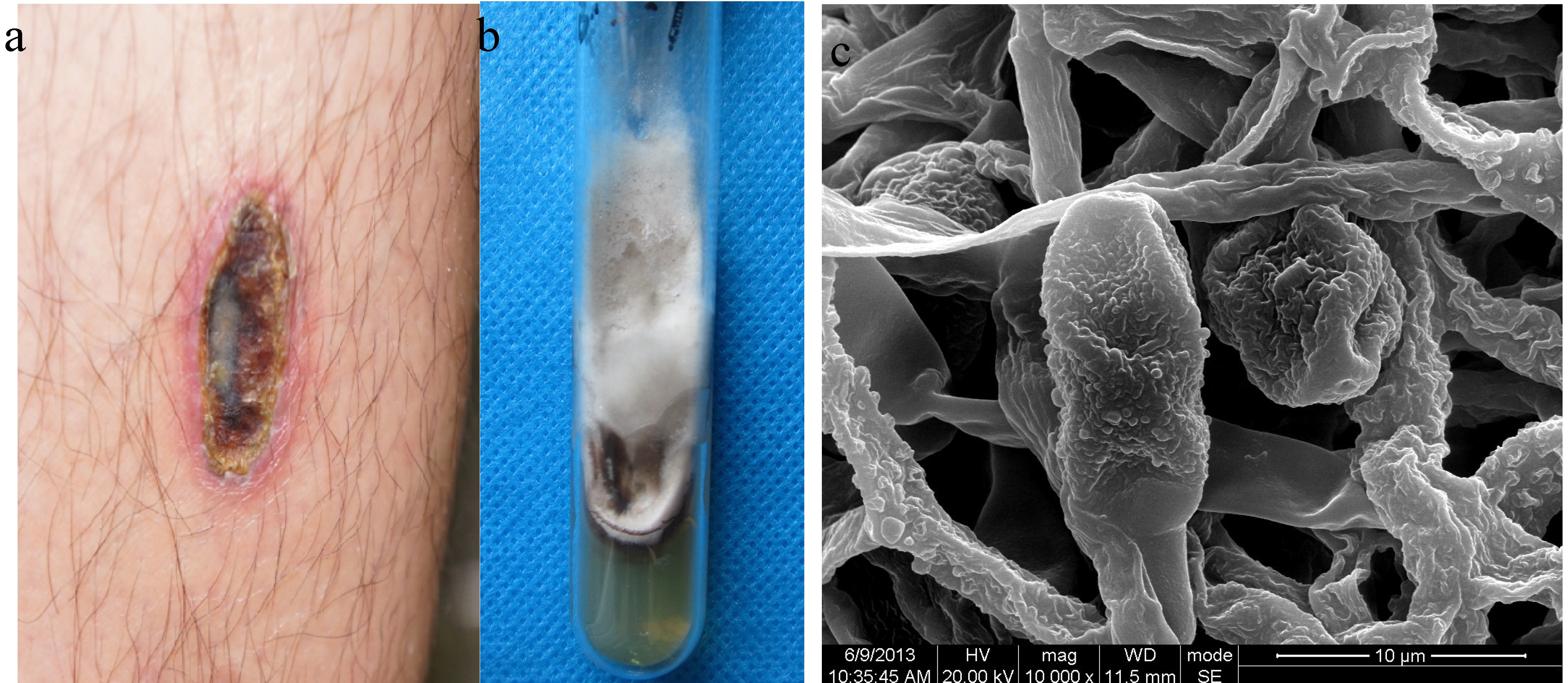
A 28-year-old man with alternariosis in his tibia caused by Alternaria arborescens and electron micrograph of his skin

As of 5 August 2023, the GBIF lists up to 602 species, while Species Fungorum lists about 645 species.

A selected few species are shown here.

- Alternaria alternata – Causes early blight of potato, leaf spot disease in Withania somnifera
- Alternaria allii - causes onion leaf blight
- Alternaria arborescens – causes stem canker of tomato
- Alternaria arbusti – causes leaf lesions on Asian pear
- Alternaria blumeae – causes lesions on Blumea aurita
- Alternaria brassicae – infests many vegetables and roses
- Alternaria brassicicola – grows on cole crops
- Alternaria burnsii – causing cumin blossom blight
- Alternaria carotiincultae – causes leaf blight on carrot
- Alternaria carthami
- Alternaria celosiae
- Alternaria cinerariae
- Alternaria citri – causes black rot on citrus plants
- Alternaria conjuncta – grows on parsnip
- Alternaria cucumerina – grows on various cucurbits
- Alternaria dauci – grows on carrot
- Alternaria dianthi
- Alternaria dianthicola
- Alternaria eichhorniae – infests water hyacinth plants, used as bioherbicide against these weeds
- Alternaria euphorbiicola – infests cole crops
- Alternaria eureka
- Alternaria gaisen – causes ringspot disease of pear
- Alternaria helianthi
- Alternaria helianthicola
- Alternaria hungarica
- Alternaria infectoria – infests wheat
- Alternaria japonica – infests cole crops
- Alternaria limicola – earliest diverging lineage of Section Porri
- Alternaria linicola - linseed plants (Linum usitatissimum)
- Alternaria longipes – infects tobacco
- Alternaria mali
- Alternaria molesta – may cause skin lesions on porpoises
- Alternaria panax – causes ginseng blight
- Alternaria perpunctulata
- Alternaria petroselini – causes parsley leaf blight
- Alternaria porri
- Alternaria quercicola
- Alternaria radicina – causes carrot decay
- Alternaria raphani
- Alternaria saponariae
- Alternaria selini – causes parsley crown decay
- Alternaria senecionis
- Alternaria solani – causes early blight in potatoes and tomatoes
- Alternaria smyrnii – infests alexanders and parsleys
- Alternaria tenuissima
- Alternaria triticina
- Alternaria ventricosa
- Alternaria zinniae

== Other sources ==
- Lawrence, DP; Park, MS; Pryor, BM (2012). "Nimbya and Embellisia revisited, with nov. comb. for Alternaria celosiae and A. perpunctulata". Mycological Progress. 11 (3): 799–815. Bibcode:2012MycPr..11..799L. doi:10.1007/s11557-011-0793-7. S2CID 18225986.
- Lawrence, DP; Gannibal, PB; Peever, TL; Pryor, BM (2013). "The sections of Alternaria: formalizing species-group concepts". Mycologia. 105 (3): 530–546. doi:10.3852/12-249. PMID 23687125. S2CID 31226062.
- Asan, A (2015). "Checklist of Alternaria Species Reported From Turkey". Mantar Dergisi. 6 (2): 43–57. doi:10.15318/Fungus.2015214064.
