= Phytophthora quercina =

Scientific classification
- Domain: Eukaryota
- Clade: Sar
- Clade: Stramenopiles
- Phylum: Oomycota
- Class: Peronosporomycetes
- Order: Peronosporales
- Family: Peronosporaceae
- Genus: Phytophthora
- Species: P. quercina

Binomial name
- Phytophthora quercina T. Jung and T.I. Burgess, 2009

Species of single-celled organism

Phytophthora quercina is a papillate homothallic soil-borne plant pathogen causing root rot of oak tree species in Europe. It is associated with necrotic fine roots.

In culture, this species shows a uniform, dome-shaped and cottonwool-like colony growth pattern. It also frequently presents sympodially branched primary hyphae, a high proportion of elongated, ellipsoid or ovoid oogonia, the absence of amphigynous antheridia. Its sporangia vary greatly in size and shape.

Its name derives from Greek Phytophthora φυτόν (phytón), “plant” and φθορά (phthorá), “destruction,” and quercina stems from the affected genus, Quercus.

== Disease cycle ==
Phytophthora quercina is a soil-borne pathogen and has a polycyclic disease cycle. Its spores and structures vary in size, shape, and appearance. The pathogen may survive in the soil in unfavorable conditions as chlamydospores that are spherical in shape, but they are not produced consistently even when conditions are unfavorable for survival. The oogonia are spherical to ovoid in shape and come together with paragynous antheridia to form oospores that are globose during the sexual stage of the disease cycle. The pathogen is homothallic and only requires one mating type to form oospores. The oospores, mycelia, or chlamydospores will produce papillae sporangia that may vary in shape, including ovoid, globose, ampulliform, or peanut-shaped that dislodge easily from their sporangiophore. The sporangia may germinate and infect host tissue or germinate and produce motile, biflagellate zoospores which encyst on host tissue and produce a germ tube to infect the host. The zoospores, sporangia, or chlamydospores may produce a germ tube to infect the host at the root cap and non-septate mycelia will form in the roots and cause primary and secondary disease symptoms and continue the disease cycle. Zoospores and chlamydospores can survive in the soil without a host for up to two years. Zoospores are easily disseminated in soil and free water. Long distance dispersal is possible when infested soil is moved on equipment or clothing or when an infected plant is transplanted.

Table 1: Size and shape of sexual and survival structures of P. quercina
Structure	Shape	Size
Chlamydospore	spherical	17-35 μm diameter
Oogonium	irregular; spherical to ovoid	19-45 μm diameter; up to 52 μm long
Antheridium	paragynous	--
Oospore	globose	18-38 μm diameter
Sporangium	papillae; ovoid, globose, obpyriform, or ampulliform	19-112 μm long; 14-47 μm wide.
Zoospore	biflagellate	--

== Host and symptoms ==
=== Host ===
Phytophthora quercina has a host range restricted to European oak tree species (Quercus spp.). The host species affected are:

- Quercus cerris – European turkey oak
- Quercus frainetto – Italian oak
- Quercus hartwissiana – Hartwissiana oak
- Quercus ilex – holly oak
- Quercus petraea – sessile oak
- Quercus pubescens – downy oak
- Quercus robur – common oak
- Quercus vulcanica – Kasnak oak

These oak tree species are located within the known distribution range of P. quercina, which is currently reported only in Europe (Austria, Belgium, France, Germany, Hungary, Italy, Luxembourg, Netherlands, Serbia, Sweden, United Kingdom) and one country in Asia (Turkey). It’s likely that P. quercina would be pathogenic to Quercus species in other countries with favorable conditions if it were introduced. P. quercina is more pathogenic to Quercus robur than other Phytophthora species found in the soil within its range. The relationship between the presence of P. quercina and the presentation of disease is unclear; the pathogen is found in the soil of both diseased and healthy trees.

=== Symptoms ===
The symptoms of P. quercina are similar to those of other pathogens associated with oak decline. The primary underground symptom is necrotic root lesions (root rot) in the fine roots. The secondary symptoms occur above-ground and include leaf clusters, branch abscission, epicormic shoots, crown thinning, branch and crown dieback, reduced growth, chlorosis or wilted leaves, leaf and trunk necrosis, loose bark, and sapwood discoloration. All of the secondary symptoms are due to water stress and poor nutrition caused by the rotting within the roots that prevents efficient water and nutrient transport. Tree mortality occurs gradually. The primary and secondary symptoms are characteristic of forest Phytophthora species pathogens, but there is no unique characteristic that functions as a diagnostic feature for P. quercina and diagnosis in the field without laboratory isolation is not possible. There are no unique features to distinguish P. quercina from other Group I Phytophthora species, however it is identifiable by a unique combination of vegetative, gametangial, and physiological characters that describe the species from others in its genus.

== Environment ==
Phytophthora quercina is an oomycete pathogen that requires free water to disperse, but field and lab studies have indicated that P. quercina displays high plasticity and adaptability to soil moisture, pH, and nutrient conditions. The pathogen can cause root damage when moisture conditions are extremely wet or restricted. In addition, spores may survive in the soil during extended dry periods without a host. Phytophthora species cause more severe disease at higher pH levels. Sporangia cannot be formed at pH levels below 4.0, and sporangia production is increased with increasing pH. P. quercina can be isolated from soils with pH ranging from 3.5-6.6. Pathogenicity is increased with low aluminum and high calcium soil concentrations, although soil composition within the range of P. quercina are often unfavorable yet disease symptoms are still observed in infected roots. High soil nitrate has been identified as a stimulating factor for production of sporangia. P. quercina has been isolated from lab cultures in both low pH, nitrogen-rich but nutrient poor soil and high pH, nutrient rich soil with restricted water and the results prove the plasticity of the pathogen under somewhat unfavorable conditions. P. quercina has been shown to only infect the roots of the host but not the stem and collar of seedlings.
