= Phytophthora uliginosa =

Scientific classification
- Domain: Eukaryota
- Clade: Sar
- Clade: Stramenopiles
- Phylum: Oomycota
- Class: Peronosporomycetes
- Order: Peronosporales
- Family: Peronosporaceae
- Genus: Phytophthora
- Species: P. uliginosa

Binomial name
- Phytophthora uliginosa Jung et al., (2002)

Species of single-celled organism

Phytophthora uliginosa is a non-papillate homothallic plant pathogen that mainly infects European oak. It differs from other species of the genus (like P. fragariae) by its large oogonia with exclusively paragynous antheridia and the predominant occurrence of ellipsoid sporangia with markedly wide exit pores. P. uliginosa is separated from P. europaea by its larger oogonia without tapering bases and its greater aggressiveness on Quercus robur.
