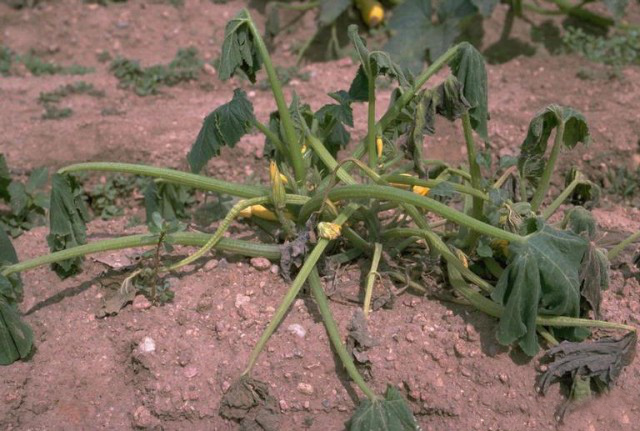
- Symptom of blight on a pumpkin plant

Scientific classification
- Domain: Eukaryota
- Supergroup: Stramenopiles
- Division: Oomycota
- Class: Peronosporomycetes
- Order: Peronosporales
- Family: Peronosporaceae
- Genus: Phytophthora
- Species: P. capsici

Binomial name
- Phytophthora capsici Leonian, (1922)

Synonyms
- Phytophthora parasitica var. capsici (Leonian) Sarej., s(1936)

= Phytophthora capsici =

Fungal plant disease

Phytophthora capsici is an oomycete plant pathogen that causes blight and fruit rot of peppers and other important commercial crops. It was first described by L. Leonian at the New Mexico State University Agricultural Experiment Station in Las Cruces in 1922 on a crop of chili peppers. In 1967, a study by M. M. Satour and E. E. Butler found 45 species of cultivated plants and weeds susceptible to P. capsici . In Greek, Phytophthora capsici means "plant destroyer of capsicums". P. capsici has a wide range of hosts including members of the families Solanaceae and Cucurbitaceae as well as Fabaceae.

== Hosts ==
Under field conditions, P. capsici has been found to affect a wide range of hosts in the families Cucurbitaceae, Fabaceae, and Solanaceae, including: cantaloupe, cucumber, watermelon, bell pepper, tomato, snap beans, and lima beans.

Although beans, lima beans, and soybeans were previously thought to be immune to P. capsici, in 2000 and 2001, "Phytophthora capsici was isolated from five commercial cultivars of lima bean in Delaware, Maryland, and New Jersey. It was also recently isolated from commercial snap beans in northern Michigan."

== Symptoms ==
=== General symptoms ===
General symptoms on the solanaceous crops and cucurbits include seed rot and seedling blight which discolors the roots and causes seedlings to topple over. Preemergence and postemergence damping-off are also possible symptoms that may occur.

=== Bean ===
Include water-soaked foliage, stem and pod necrosis.

=== Pepper ===
Infection of the pepper commonly starts at the soil line leading to symptoms of dark, water soaked areas on the stem. Dark lesions of the stem may girdle the plant resulting in death. Roots of the pepper plant appear brown and mushy. Leaf spots start out small and become water soaked, and as time progresses may enlarge turn tan and crack. Blighting of new leaves may also take place. The fruit of the pepper is infected through the stem giving way to water soaked areas on the fruit that are overgrown by signs of the pathogen which appear as, "white-gray, cottony, fungal-like growth" (hyphae). The fruit mummifies and stays attached to the stem.

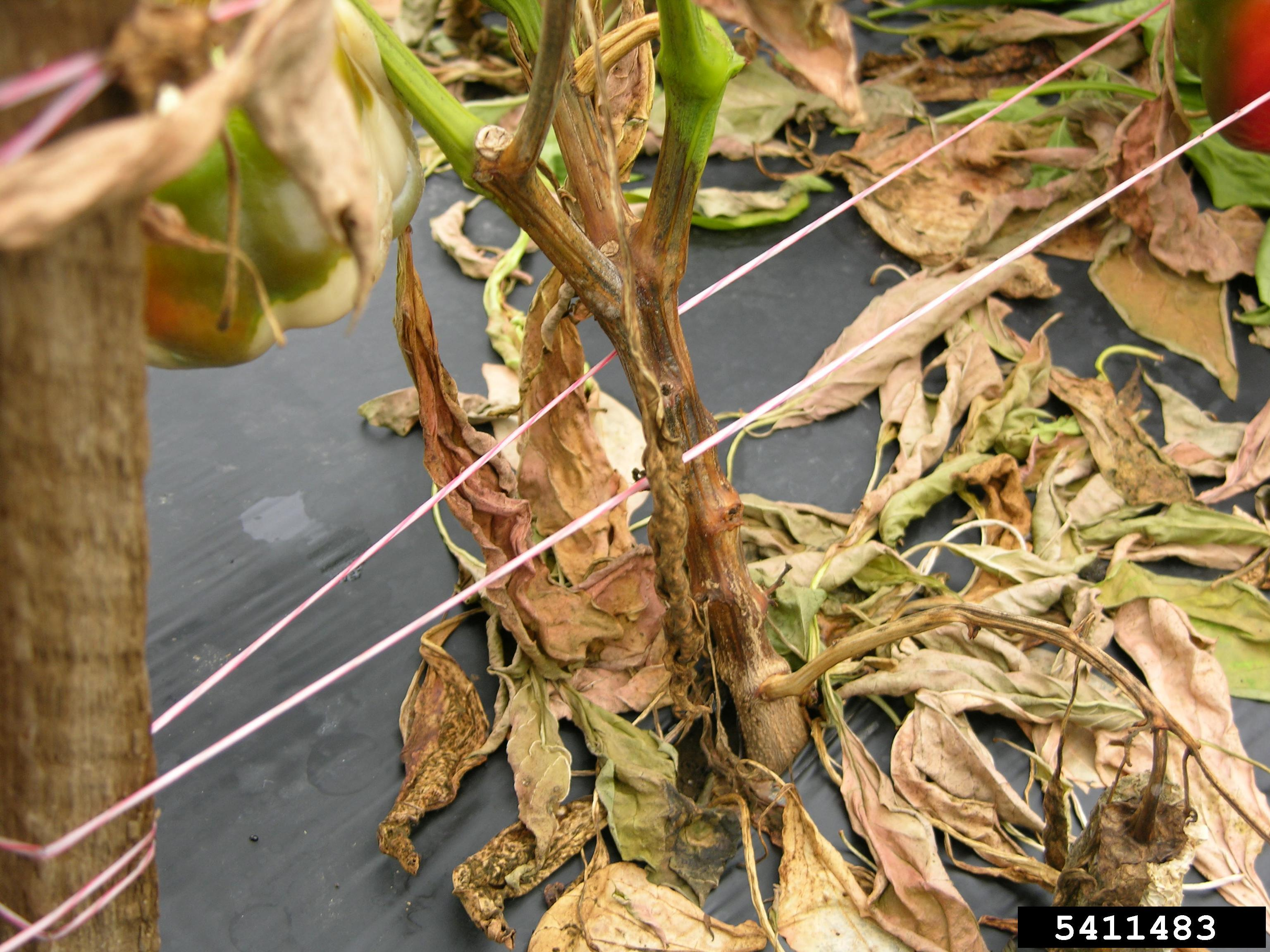
P. capsici blight on lower stem of a bell pepper plant.

=== Eggplant ===
Solanum melongena: Fruit rot is the primary symptom of the eggplant. A dark brown area of the fruit expands into a light tan region. Signs of fungal-like growth may be seen on the lesions.

=== Tomato ===
Solanum lycopersicum: P. capsici can cause crown infections, leaf spot, and foliar blight in tomato. The plant may eventually topple over from the crown rot. Fruit rot with patterns of concentric rings is another possible symptom.

=== Squash ===
Foliar blight with rapidly expanding water soaked regions and fruit rot are common symptoms on susceptible species of summer and winter squash varieties. These lead to dieback of shoot tips, wilting, shoot rot, and plant death. White fungal growth is also a sign of the pathogen in squash.

=== Watermelon ===
Foliar symptoms are less common in watermelon than squash, but the leaves are still susceptible. Fruit rot is more common eventually leading to a total decay of the fruit.

=== Pumpkin ===
P. capsici causes pre- and post-emergence damping off of seedlings. It also causes vine blight contributing to developing water soaked lesions on the vine which start off as dark olive-colored and soon turn dark brown. This leads to rapid collapse and death of foliage above the lesions. Similar lesions may appear on the leaves and petioles of the pumpkin. Fruit rot is also a very common symptom.

=== Cantelope ===
Similar symptoms to that of the watermelon.

=== Cucumber ===
Symptoms of the cucumber are similar to that of other cucurbits, but do not include crown gall as a symptom.

== Disease cycle ==
P. capsici is a heterothallic oomycete. The sexual types are designated as A1 and A2. Phytophthora capsici produces both a male and a female type gametangia called an antheridium (male) and an oogonium (female). The antheridium is amphigynous in the species, meaning that the antheridium may remain in this male form of the gametangia or develop into the female gametangia which is an oogonium. Karyogamy between these two types of gametangia one being from the A1 sexual type and the other of the A2 sexual type results in the formation of an overwintering oospore. The oospores may directly germinate into a germ tube or indirectly germinate and give rise to sporangia which then indirectly germinates and gives rise to zoospores. Zoospores are biflagellate motile spores with one long tinsel flagella directed forward and one shorter whiplash flagella directed backward. These biflagellate zoospores are responsible for the polycyclic qualities of this disease.

Chlamydospores, found in other Phytophthora species, have not been documented on P. capsici in nature or formed on isolates that were collected from a range of hosts and locations.

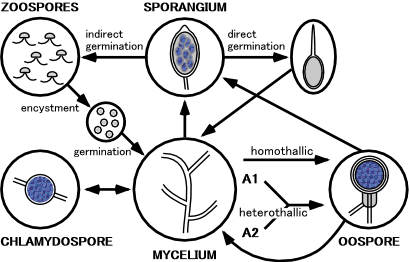
The life-cycle of a typical Phytophthora fungi.

== Environment ==
Disease initially occurs in low areas of fields where water accumulates, often leading growers to believe that stunting and death of the cultivar is due to water logging. P. capsici grows best at 80 °F (27 °C). It rapidly spreads in warm wet conditions. The asexual spore bearing structures called sporangia are spread by irrigation water, drainage water, and rain. These indirectly germinate and release zoospores.

== Management ==
Crop rotation may reduce the number of pathogens in the soil and, "a minimum of a 3 years crop rotation which alternates with non-host species is recommended to avoid build-up of P. capsici spores." Crops should also avoid conditions that would be conducive to the pathogen by using well drained soils and raised beds. As stated above, "Excess moisture is the single most important component to the initial infection and subsequent spreading of Phytophthora capsici." Overall, a study by K.H. Lamour and M.K. Hausbeck found that "crop rotation and mefenoxam are not likely to provide economic control". Mefenoxem is the active enantiomer contained in the racemic fungicide metalaxyl used to defend against Phytophthora capsici. Sexual recombination provides the genetic diversity to promote resistance towards fungicides in P. capsici. The failure of crop rotation as a means to control P. capsici may also be due to weeds playing the role of an alternative host in the absence of common hosts. According to a study done by the University of Florida, "In Florida, and perhaps elsewhere, weeds may contribute to pathogen survival in the absence of a host crop or when propagules may not readily survive in soil or plant debris." To avoid fruit rot of vegetable crops in the Cucurbitaceae, trellising cucurbit fruits and other ways to keep the fruit off the ground is a way to control secondary inoculants (zoospores) from physically being splashed from the soil onto the fruit. Control of Phytophthora capsici is easier in drier climates with less rainfall such as California. In these areas, it is important to practice placing drip irrigation emitters away from the stems of pepper plants in order to reduce the incidence of crown rot in peppers.

Although resistance has been developed in the cultivars Adra (Abbott and Cobb Seed Co.) and Emerald Isle (Harris Moran Seed Co.), they do not possess sufficient horticultural characteristics accepted by bell pepper growers in the U.S.. Paladin (Novartis Seed Co.) has excellent resistance to the crown rot phase of Phytophthora rot and is acceptable to most growers. Paladin does not possess resistance to the foliar phase of this disease and one must use copper fungicides along with the resistant strain for control.

== Importance ==
Phytophthora capsici was first described by Leon H. Leonian at the New Mexico Agricultural Research Station in Las Cruces in 1922. After this, issues were documented in the Arkansas River Valley of Colorado in the 1930s and 1940s. Major research was initiated by M.K. Hausbeck and K.H. Lamour when crop losses due to P. capsici threatened to bankrupt numerous vegetable producers in Michigan (which could potentially threaten 134 million dollars' worth of vegetable crops). P. capsici is also important on a global scale. It is potentially the most destructive disease of peppers in Spain.
