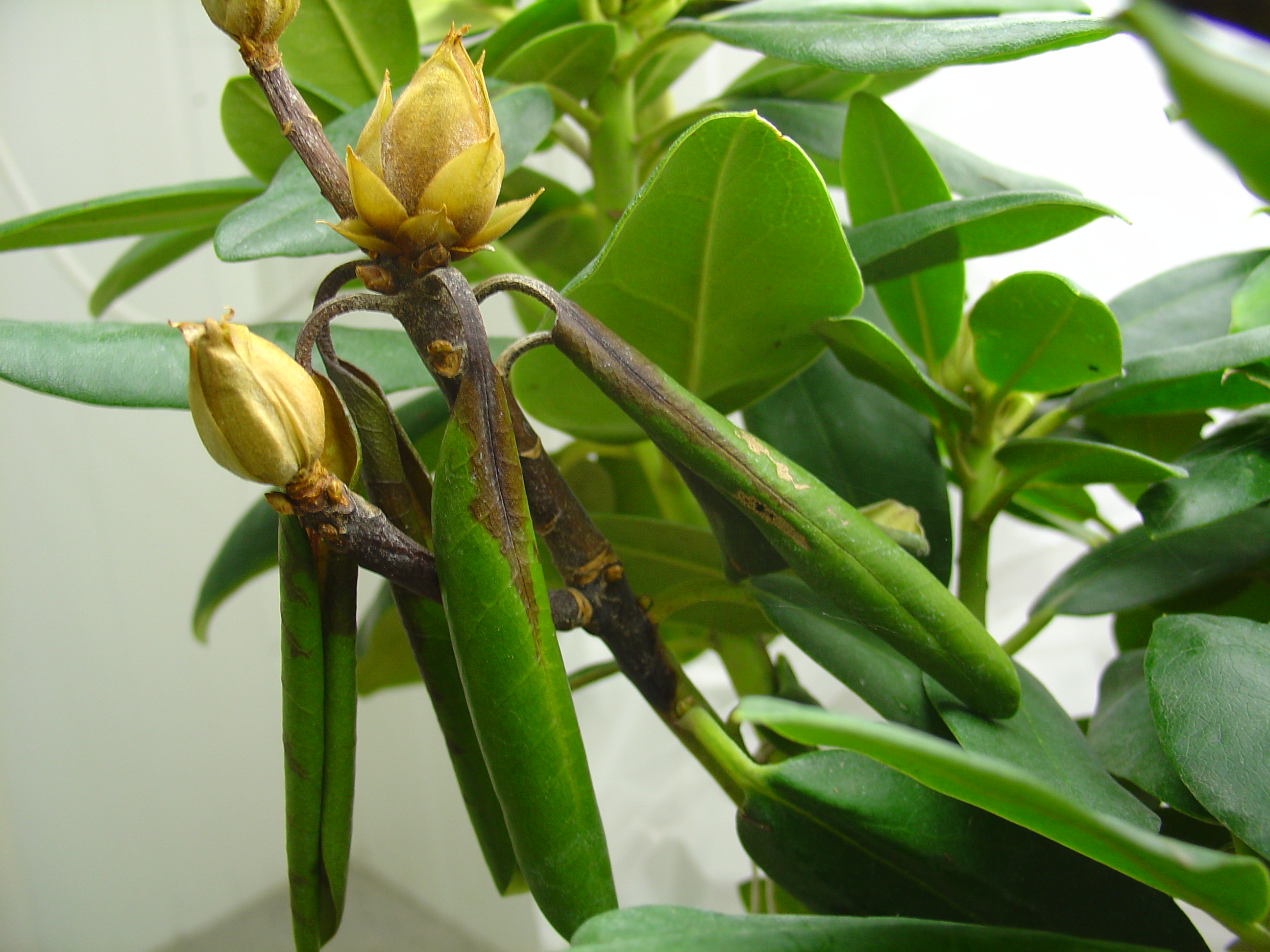
- Rhododendron shoot blight caused by Phytophthora plurivora

Scientific classification
- Domain: Eukaryota
- Clade: Sar
- Clade: Stramenopiles
- Division: Oomycota
- Class: Peronosporomycetes
- Order: Peronosporales
- Family: Peronosporaceae
- Genus: Phytophthora
- Species: P. plurivora

Binomial name
- Phytophthora plurivora T. Jung and T.I. Burgess, 2009

= Phytophthora plurivora =

Species of single-celled organism

Phytophthora plurivora is a very aggressive soil-borne plant pathogen, with worldwide distribution and a wide variety of hosts.

It belongs to the class of oomycetes and is often described as a ‘fungal-like’ organism since they form a heterotrophic mycelium as the ‘true fungi’, but in contrast, their cell wall lacks chitin and is composed only of cellulose and glucans.

Its name derives from Greek Phytophthora φυτόν (phytón), “plant” and φθορά (phthorá), “destruction”; “the plant-destroyer” and plurivora from Latin (pluri = many, -vora = feeding).

== Origins ==
Phytophthora plurivora was first described by Sawada (1927) as P. citricola (isolated from citrus in Taiwan) based just on morphological and physiological characters. After a more accurate work T. Jung and T.I. Burgess, based not just on morphological and physiological characters, but also on phylogenetic analyses, proposed that the isolates of P. citricola showed a high diversity and were then subdivided into four new groups, among them the new species P. plurivora sp. nov. P. citricola and P. plurivora differ in length and breadth ratio of sporangia, colony growth patterns and optimal temperature. P. plurivora shows homothallic, paragynous antheridia and semipapillate sporangia resembling lemons.

It is assumed that P. plurivora was imported from overseas on living plant stock and could spread in Europe because of perfect climate conditions and ubiquitous presence of host plants.

== Biology ==
P. plurivora can be found in the soil and in plant tissues, can take different shapes and can move in water, since it has motile zoospores. During periods of harsh environmental conditions, the organisms become dormant chlamydospores. When environmental conditions are suitable, the chlamydospores germinate, producing mycelia (or hyphae) and sporangia. The sporangia ripen and release zoospores, which infect plant roots by entering the root behind the root tip. Zoospores need water to swim through the soil, therefore infection is most likely in moist soils. Mycelia grow throughout the root absorbing carbohydrates and nutrients, destroying the structure of the root tissues, "rotting" the root, and preventing the plant from absorbing water and nutrients, in some cases, leading to the death of the plants. Since it is a hemibiotrophic organism it parasitizes living tissues for a period and can continue its life cycle on dead tissues. Sporangia and chlamydospores form on the mycelia of the infected root, and the cycle of infection continues to the next plant.

== Impact on ecosystems ==
Phytophthora species have been responsible for damaging several ecosystems. Recent studies are showing P. plurivora as the main organism promoting disease and for declining beech (Fagus sylvatica) trees in European forests, raising attention of main authorities in the area. The number of declining trees is rising over last years. It is still unclear how to effectively manage or control this aggressive pathogen in forest ecosystems.
