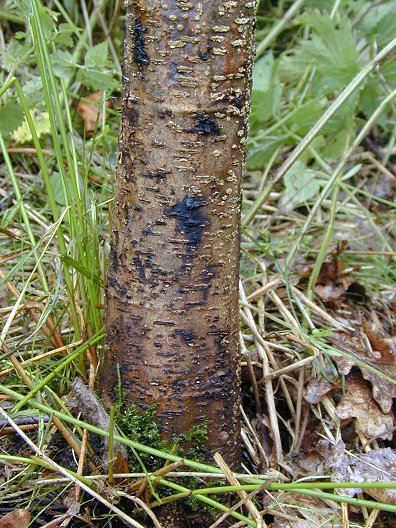
- An alder infected by Phytophthora alni

Scientific classification
- Domain: Eukaryota
- Clade: Sar
- Clade: Stramenopiles
- Phylum: Oomycota
- Class: Peronosporomycetes
- Order: Peronosporales
- Family: Peronosporaceae
- Genus: Phytophthora
- Species: P. alni

Binomial name
- Phytophthora alni Brasier & S.A.Kirk

Subspecies
- Phytophthora alni alni; Phytophthora alni uniformis; Phytophthora alni multiformis

= Phytophthora alni =

Species of single-celled organism

Phytophthora alni is an oomycete plant pathogen that causes lethal root and collar rot in alders. It is widespread across Europe and has recently been found in North America. This species is believed to have originated relatively recently.

== Classification ==
Phytophythora alni was discovered in 1993 in Southern Britain. It has subsequently been reported in many European countries including the Netherlands, Germany, France, Sweden, Belgium, Austria and Hungary and has recently been found in Alaska. P. alni consists of three subspecies, the most commonly isolated and most virulent subspecies P. alni alni (also referred to as the 'standard form') and two less commonly isolated subspecies P. alni uniformis (also called the Swedish variant) and P. alni multiformis (which contains the Dutch, German and UK variants). A recent genetic analysis has suggested that P. alni alni. was generated on many separate occasions by the hybridization of either P. alni uniformis with P. alni multiformis or their ancestors. The same analysis suggests that P. alni uniformis may have P. cambivora as an ancestor. P. alni multiformis may have been generated by autopolyploidization (the spontaneous duplication of chromosome number within a species) or by a hybridisation of two unknown species a long time ago in evolutionary terms (ancient reticulation).

== Reproduction ==
Members of the genus Phytophthora may reproduce by both sexual and asexual methods. P. alni is homothallic meaning that both structures for sexual reproduction (antheridia and oogonia) appear in a single culture. The antheridia are amphigynous, except in some cultures of P. alni. multiformis where paragynous antheridia may occur. Unlike most species of Phytophthora, which are diploid, P. alni alni is near tetraploid and unable to complete meiosis beyond metaphase I. In culture, many oogonia prematurely abort or appear abnormal and only one third of the oospores that appear normal are reported to be viable. As a result, it is believed to spread predominantly via asexual means, namely zoospores which are produced in a specialised structure known as the sporangium. Water temperature has been shown to affect sporulation, with warmer water increasing sporangia production. Temperatures of 8 °C and below prevent production of sporangia.

== Infection ==
Affected alder species include:

- Alnus cordata - Italian alder
- Alnus glutinosa - Common alder (most susceptible)
- Alnus incana - Grey alder (most resistant)
- Alnus viridis - Green alder

The only trees described as affected in the wild are alder trees; however, greenhouse inoculation trials have suggested that walnut (Juglans regia), chestnut (Castanea sativa) and wild cherry (Prunus avium) trees may also be susceptible. Risk factors for infection include: water temperature (disease risk is higher in warmer waters), soil type (disease risk is higher in fine textured soil, especially clay loams) and water course type (disease risk is higher in slow flowing water courses).

Infected trees have abnormally small, yellow and sparse leaves which frequently fall prematurely. The crowns of trees which have been infected for many years have many dead twigs and branches. Tarry or rusty spots may appear at the base of the trunk which are indicative of the death of the phloem caused by the P. alni invasion. The course of the disease is varied, with many trees dying rapidly once symptoms appear, however, others may deteriorate slowly over many years.

P.alni is regarded as a serious threat to riparian woodland. In 2007 Oregon listed P.alni as one of its "100 most dangerous invasive species to keep out".

== See also ==
- Forest pathology
