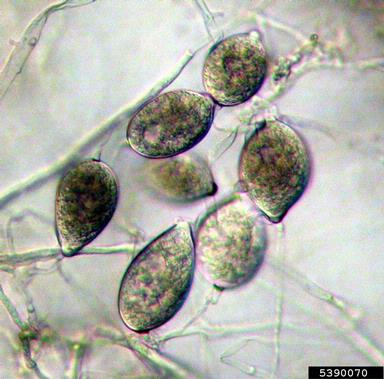
- Phytophthora colocasiae sporangia on sporangiophores

Scientific classification
- Domain: Eukaryota
- Clade: Sar
- Clade: Stramenopiles
- Clade: Pseudofungi
- Phylum: Oomycota
- Class: Oomycetes
- Order: Peronosporales
- Family: Peronosporaceae
- Genus: Phytophthora
- Species: P. colocasiae

Binomial name
- Phytophthora colocasiae Racib. 1900

= Taro leaf blight =

Species of single-celled organism

== Hosts and symptoms ==
First described in Java by Marian Raciborski in 1900, taro leaf blight is caused by the oomycete Phytophthora colocasiae, which infects primarily Colocasia spp. and Alocasia macrorrhizos. P. colocasiae primarily infects leaves, but can also infect petioles and corms.

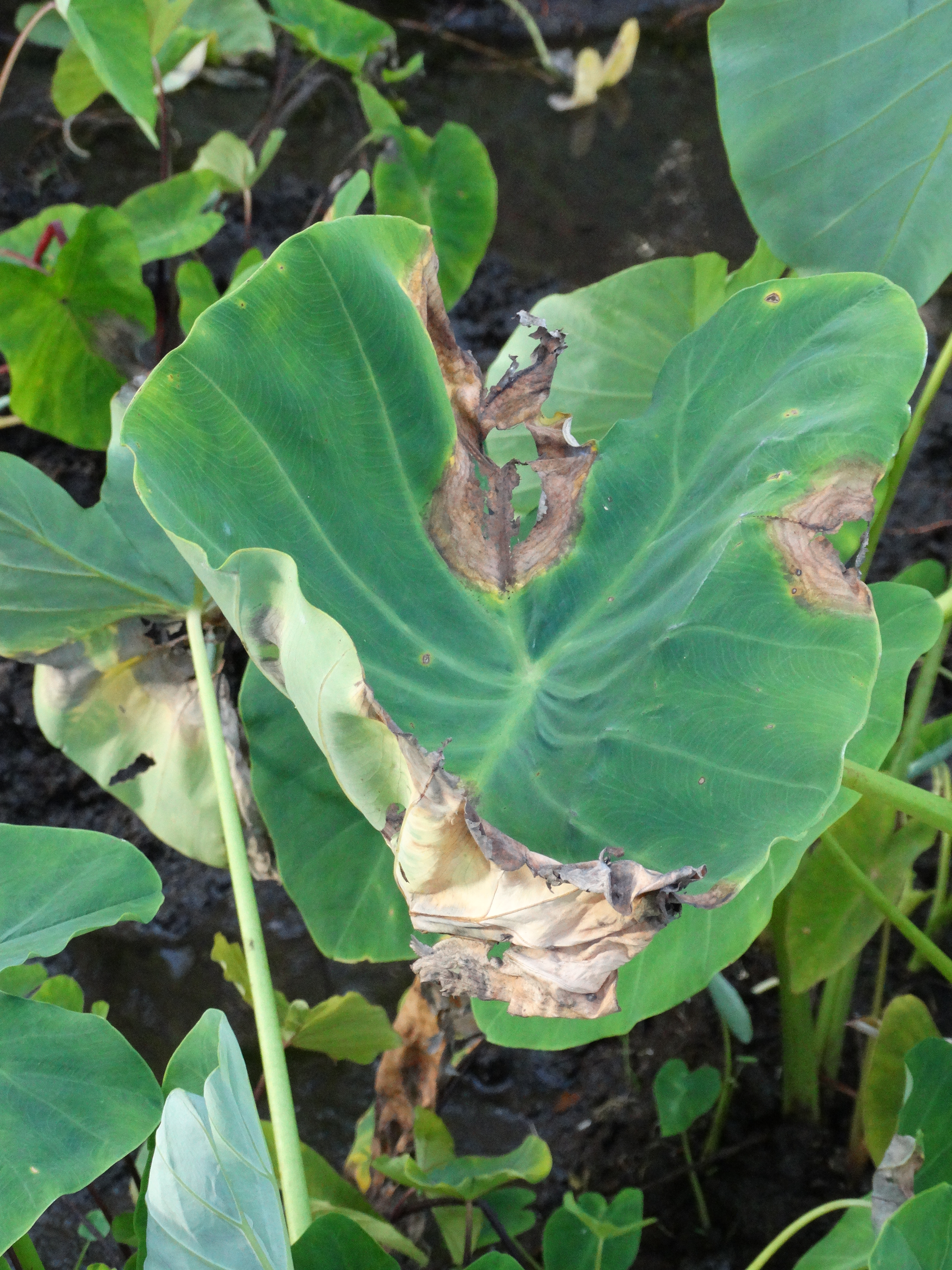
Taro plant in Hawaii infected by Phytophthora colocasiae

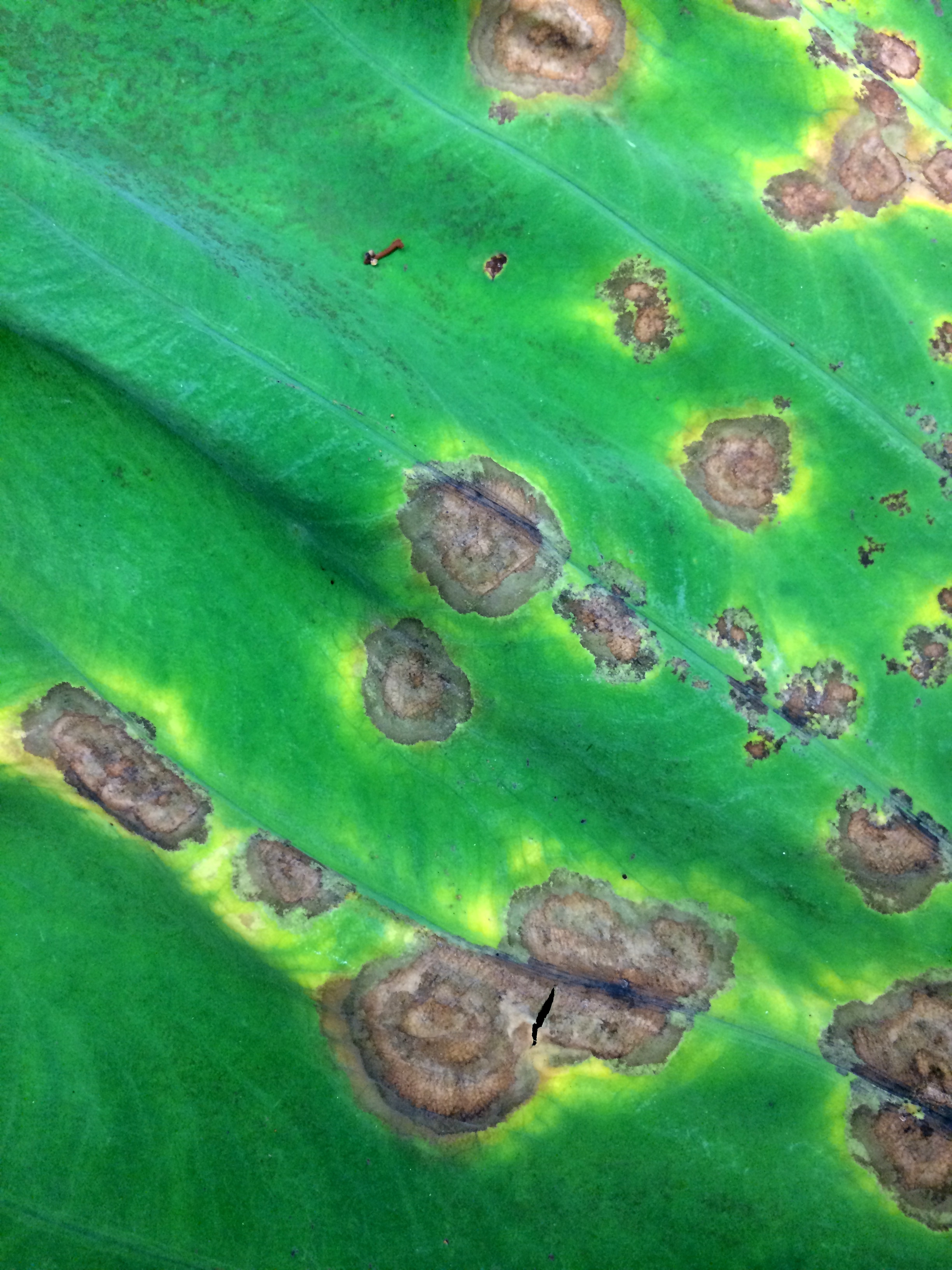
Brown lesions on taro; Credit: Scot Nelson, University of Hawaii at Manoa

Symptoms on leaves initially occur where water droplets accumulate and eventually form small, brown spots surrounded by halos on the upper surface of leaves. These spots expand very quickly and form large brown lesions. The entire leaf can be destroyed within a few days of the initial appearance of symptoms under wet conditions. The undersides of leaves have spots that look water-soaked or gray, and as they expand, blight forms and the leaf is destroyed within a few days. Symptoms occur in a day/night pattern where water soaked areas expand during the night and then dry out during the day. As a result, additional water marks form leading to increasingly larger lesions. As the lesions expand, sporangia develop most actively at the margin of the lesion and progress to attack healthy tissue.

One characteristic feature found on leaves is the formation of bright orange droplets oozing out from above and below water soaked leaf surfaces. As a result, the droplets dry out during the day and become crusty. Another sign of P. colocasiae infection are masses of sporangia that form a white, powdery ring around the lesion. Symptoms on petioles includes gray to brownish black lesions that can occur anywhere on the petioles. Petioles become soft and may break as the pathogen destroys the host.

Symptoms on corms are often rubber-like and soft as well as having a light tan color. These symptoms occur rapidly and can arise anywhere on the corm and are often subtle in early stages. Decayed corm tissue appears brown and turns purplish in advanced stages of infection.

Lesions can also be formed by sporangia that are splashed by rain. The dead central area breaks and falls out as the lesion gets larger. The rate of spread for this disease is very high which results in a high percentage of yield loss.

== Disease cycle ==
P. colocasiae is an oomycete and is thus characterized by oospores and coenocytic hyphae. Oospores have very thick-walls which provide durable survival structures. As a result, oospores overwinter in soil, underground storage organs, or on leaf debris left in the field after harvest. However, inoculum does not survive for very long on leaf tissue. Other Colocasia plants, such as elephant-ear and dasheen, are an additional means of survival for this pathogen. Finally, chlamydospores have been produced under ideal laboratory conditions in culture and may also serve as a survival structure in addition to oospores. However, chlamydospores have not yet been observed in the field. Therefore, it is not known if chlamydospores are really part of the Phytophthora colocasiae disease cycle.

Upon infection, oospores that overwinter on leaf tissue and petioles give rise to sporangiophores which have lemon-shaped sporangia at their tips. Sporangia can infect taro leaves either directly via germ tubes or indirectly by producing zoospores. Whether sporangia infect directly or indirectly depends on weather conditions.

If weather conditions are favorable, such as warm temperatures, sporangia infect directly via germ tubes. Germ tubes give rise to appressorium which form haustorium and allow the pathogen to extract nutrients without penetrating the host’s cell membrane. As a result, more sporangia are formed and if weather conditions remain favorable, additional sporangia are produced and infection continues either directly or indirectly on other hosts.

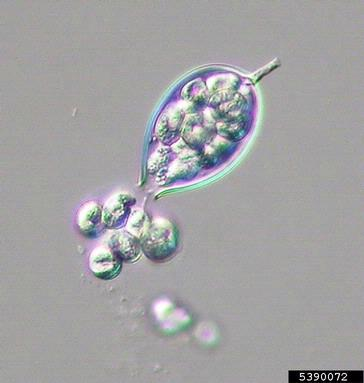
Zoospore release from sporangia; Credit: Fred Brooks, University of Hawaii at Manoa, Bugwood.org

Indirect infections occur under unfavorable or very wet conditions by releasing zoospores from sporangia. Zoospores lose their flagella, become cysts, germinate and feed on the host via a germ tube, and produce more sporangia to continue the disease cycle.

The slanted shape of the taro leaf encourages sporangia and zoospores to spread to other hosts via splash from rain. The pathogen can also be transmitted across fields by infected plant material or contaminated tools. The pathogen can survive as mycelium for a few days in dead and dying plant tissues as well as in infected corms. On the other hand, encysted zoospores of P. colocasiae can survive for several months without a host.

Once infection season comes to an end, sexual reproduction occurs to form an oospore. In order to have successful sexual reproduction, weather conditions must be favorable and mating types must match. Two mating types, A1 and A2, exist for Phytophthora colocasiae. Hormonal signaling allows for sporangia of the two mating types to come together and initiate the development of oogonia and antheridia. An oogonium can be likened to a female reproductive organ while an antheridium carries out the role of a male reproductive organ. The penetration of an oogonium via an antheridium leads to the formation of a sexual spore or an oospore. The oospore will overwinter and germinate to produce infectious sporangia once conditions improve.

== Environment ==
The pathogen grows voraciously in areas with high humidity and heavy rainfall in addition to an optimal pH of 6.5 and temperature of 28 °C (82 °F).

The aforementioned cool, wet, and humid conditions favor both the asexual and sexual reproduction of Phytophthora colocasiae. The ideal temperature range for this pathogen is 10–35 °C (50–95 °F). Sporangia, which develop most rapidly at margins of leaf lesions, can germinate directly on leaves at temperatures ranging from 20–28 °C (68–82 °F), or spread to neighboring leaves via rain splash. During less ideal conditions, such as low temperatures nearing 20 °C (68 °F) and high humidity, sporangia release zoospores for indirect germination. Germination occurs over a period of approximately two hours, followed by a 2-4 day incubation period between germ tube penetration and the onset of disease symptoms.

The ideal temperatures for reproduction of the Phytophthora colocasiae pathogen has led to its distribution throughout cool tropical areas of Southeast Asia, from where the pathogen is thought to have originated. P. colocasiae has been observed in Indonesia, China, India, the Philippines, Malaysia, Hawaii, Papua New Guinea, and the British Solomon Islands.

== Management ==
In the past, control of P. colocasiae has been aimed largely at limiting the amount of inoculum via cultural practices. An example of such a practice is roguing, which involves the removal of all or part of infected leaves. This practice has ultimately proved ineffective as the removal of leaves largely mimics the defoliating effects of the taro leaf blight disease itself, and exacerbates the losses in yield already devastating the crop.

Increased spacing between taro plants has been explored as a method of limiting transmission. However, this method has also proven ineffective as taro plants grow best when planted close together. Therefore, increasing space between plants also decreases yield.

Chemical control of P. colocasiae has offered some relief in the form of preventative sprays containing copper, manganese, and zinc. The slanted shape of taro leaves, and prevalence of the crop in wet climates, necessitates numerous applications which may not be economically practical. The systemic fungicide metalaxyl has also been found to be effective in controlling P. colocasiae, especially when applied in conjunction with the pesticide mancozeb at the first sight of disease symptoms. While chemical control is one of the more effective methods of managing this pathogen, the fact that taro is usually a subsistence crop makes chemical control economically impractical and environmentally unsustainable.

A recent study obtained promising results using Eucalyptus globus essential oil to combat P. colocasiae. Upon chemical analysis of the essential oil, researchers determined the most abundant compounds to be 1,8-cineole, α-pinene, and p-cymene. These compounds make up 26.4%, 14.1% and 10.2% of the essential oil, respectively. In vitro studies demonstrated complete inhibition of sporangia germination and mycelial growth following applications of Eucalyptus globus essential oil at a concentration of 0.625 mg/mL and inhibition of zoospore germination at a concentration of 0.156 mg/mL. In situ, these compounds completely inhibited sporulation, necrosis, and overall disease symptom expression at a concentration of 3.5 mg/mL.

Despite the promise of chemical control, genetic resistance currently offers the best long-term control of P. colocasiae. In 2013, researchers were able to confer resistance to the taro plant via the oxalate oxidase (OxO) gene gf2.8 of wheat (Triticum aestivum). The researchers were able to isolate a transgenic line which did not develop disease symptoms following inoculation with P. colocasiae zoospores. Several Taro Leaf Blight-resistant varieties, such as the K333, K345, and Ainaben, have also been identified. While genetic resistance appears to be the most powerful tool for managing P. colocasiae thus far, certain genetic modifications result in changes in the taste and appearance of the taro plant. Due to its grave cultural and economic significance, the challenge of developing resistant varieties without decreasing the cultural and economic value of the crop remains.

== Importance ==
Taro is the fourteenth most consumed vegetable worldwide and is a staple crop both in the diet and economy of the tropics. Many tropical nations rely on taro as a main export. Taro leaf blight causes varying losses in corm yield depending on how susceptible the cultivars are to taro leaf blight infection and damage. Reductions in corm yield of 25–50% have been reported in various locations across the Pacific. Losses of 25–35% of corm yield have been recorded in the Philippines while in some extreme cases, losses of 95% have been recorded in various cultivars across Hawaiʻi.

The most recent epidemic of taro leaf blight spanned the Samoan Archipelago from 1993-1994. Taro export made up 58% of Samoa’s economy and brought in 3.5 million US dollars annually immediately prior to the epidemic in 1993. In 1994, taro exports brought in only $60,000 US dollars - a 99.98% drop in profit in just one year’s time.

The reason taro leaf blight was able to ravage Samoa’s taro crop was because taro is vegetatively propagated via cuttings and not seeds. Taro monocultures with no leaf blight resistance had been created with very little genetic variance. This narrow gene variance left the monocultures devoid of resistant plants to buffer the spread of the pathogen allowing it to quickly spread in the warm humid climate of Samoa, devastating taro production throughout the archipelago. By 2010, the taro exportation of Samoa has rebounded due to crossing the Samoan variety with resistant varieties from Southeast Asia. The implementation of virus free tissue testing has ensured that no infected vegetative tissue can be sold and grown on Samoan soil. Samoa’s epidemic served as an example for other taro exporting countries to ensure taro leaf blight resistance among plantations and to test tissue to ensure that the disease does not spread across other countries.
