= Phytophthora hydropathica =

Scientific classification
- Domain: Eukaryota
- Clade: Diaphoretickes
- Clade: Sar
- Clade: Stramenopiles
- Class: Oomycetes
- Order: Peronosporales
- Family: Peronosporaceae
- Genus: Phytophthora
- Species: P. hydropathica

Binomial name
- Phytophthora hydropathica C. Hong, M. Gallegly, P. Richardson, P. Kong, G. Moorman, J. Lea-Cox, & D. Ross, (2008)

Species of single-celled organism

Phytophthora hydropathica is an oomycete plant pathogen that is found in aquatic environments such as irrigation and river water. The pathogen was previously classified as P. drechsleri Dre II before being categorized as its own distinct species. P. hydropathica has been primarily found in association with ornamental plant nurseries. The pathogen has been isolated throughout the Southern United States, as well as internationally in Mexico, Italy, and Spain.

== Etymology ==
The species name hydropathica is composed of the word elements hydro, meaning "water" and pathica, referring to the pathogenicity.

== Hosts and symptoms ==
P. hydropathica has been shown to naturally infect a number of different plants including Catawba rhododendron, English Roseum rhododendron, mountain laurel, and Laurustinus trees. Studies have shown that the pathogen has the ability to infect other hosts when introduced, such as alder, carnations, cucumber, azaleas, dusty miller, tomato, and pepper. Symptoms of infection vary with host type.

=== Natural hosts ===
- Catawba rhododendron (Rhododendron catawbiense): necrosis of the leaf and shoot tip blight.
- English Roseum rhododendron (Rhododendron sp. 'English Roseum'): leaf lesions.
- Mountain laurel (Kalmia latifolia): wilting, discoloration, and lesions of stem, shoot blight.
- Mountain laurel (Kalmia japonica): stem wilt.
- Laurustinus trees (Viburnum tinus): wilting and shoot lesions.

=== Additional hosts ===
- Alder (Alnus glutinosa): stem necrosis and foliar lesions on leaves. Symptoms only appear on wounded tissue.
- Carnation (Dianthus caryophyllus): petal infection. Symptoms appear on wounded tissue.
- Cucumber (Cucumis sativus cv. Orient Express): damping off of seedlings.
- Azaleas (Rhodoendron Kurume hybrid cv. Hershey's Red): root rot.
- Dusty miller (Senecio bicolor subsp. cineraria cv. Silver Dust): root infection.
- Tomato (Solanum lycopersicum cv. Homestead): root infection, and fruit rot of wounded fruit.
- Tomato (Solanum lycopersicum cv. Horis): necrosis of leaves. Symptoms appear on wounded tissue.
- Pepper (Capsicum annuum cv. California Wonder): root infection, and fruit rot of wounded fruit. Necrosis of leaves appear on wounded tissue.

== Disease cycle ==
P. hydropathica is a heterothallic oomycete, meaning that both mating types need to be present in order to sexually reproduce. The A1 mating type has been reported to be highly represented in populations. The species produce plerotic oospores and round antheridia, with observations of the sexual bodies being golden in color. Nonpapillate and noncaducous sporangia are produced, with varying shapes (obpyriform, ovoid, and nearly spherical), and are able to release zoospores. Zoospore release time has been recorded to vary, from release happening immediately after sporangia formation or within hours. Some isolates do not show the ability to produce zoospores. P. hydropathica does produce chlamydospores, present at the end of long hyphae and on short pedicels. Hyphal swelling has also been observed.

== Environment ==
P. hydropathica is most commonly found in sources of water, such as reserve water ponds, irrigation systems, and rivers. The optimal temperature for growth in the lab is 30 °C (86 °F). In irrigation reservoirs in Mississippi and Alabama the pathogen has the highest counts in the month of May, and has also been shown to have high recovery rates in hot summer temperatures. In the U.S. isolates have been recovered in Alabama, Georgia, Maryland, Mississippi, North Carolina, Tennessee, and Virginia. Samples have also been isolated in Italy, Spain, and Mexico.
