= Phytophthora bilorbang =

Scientific classification
- Domain: Eukaryota
- Clade: Sar
- Clade: Stramenopiles
- Phylum: Oomycota
- Class: Peronosporomycetes
- Order: Peronosporales
- Family: Peronosporaceae
- Genus: Phytophthora
- Species: P. bilorbang

Binomial name
- Phytophthora bilorbang Aghighi et al., 2012

Species of single-celled organism

Phytophthora bilorbang is a non-papillate homothallic plant pathogen known to infect Rubus anglocandicans (European blackberry) in Western Australia. It produces non-papillate sporangia, oogonia with smooth walls containing thick-walled oospores, as well as paragynous antheridia.
