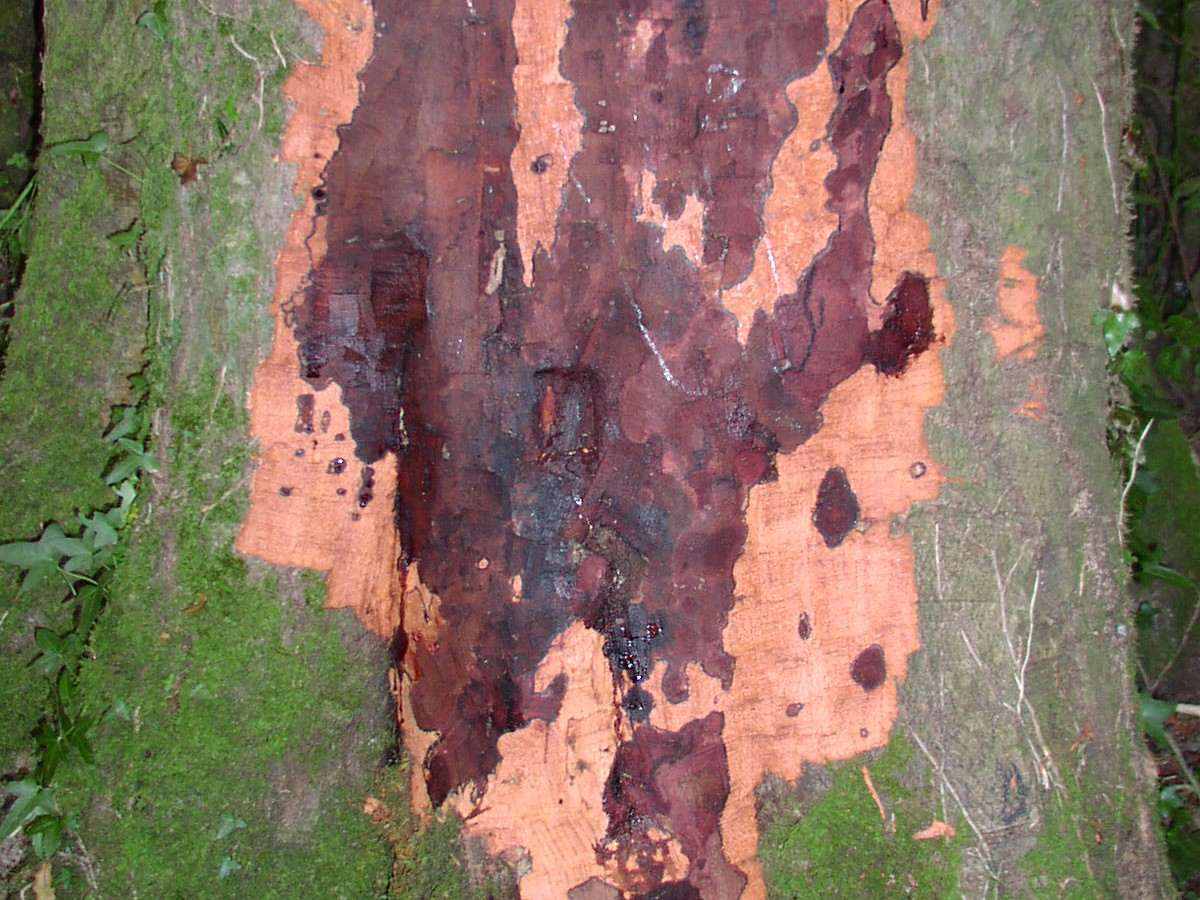
- Necrotic bark on an infected beech tree

Scientific classification
- Domain: Eukaryota
- Clade: Sar
- Clade: Stramenopiles
- Division: Oomycota
- Class: Peronosporomycetes
- Order: Peronosporales
- Family: Peronosporaceae
- Genus: Phytophthora
- Species: P. kernoviae

Binomial name
- Phytophthora kernoviae Brasier, (2005)

= Phytophthora kernoviae =

Species of oomycete

Phytophthora kernoviae is a plant pathogen that mainly infects European beech (Fagus sylvatica) and Rhododendron ponticum. It was first identified in 2003 in Cornwall, UK when scientists were surveying for the presence of Phytophthora ramorum. This made it the third new Phytophthora species to be found in the UK in a decade. It was named Phytophthora kernoviae after the ancient name for Cornwall, Kernow. It causes large stem lesions on beech and necrosis of stems and leaves of Rhododendron ponticum. It is self-fertile. It has also been isolated from Quercus robur and Liriodendron tulipifera. The original paper describing the species, stated it can infect Magnolia and Camellia species, Pieris formosa, Gevuina avellana, Michelia doltsopa and Quercus ilex. Since then many other plants have been identified as natural hosts of the pathogen. Molecular analysis has revealed that an infection on Pinus radiata, recorded in New Zealand in 1950, was caused by P. kernoviae. The pathogen was also noted on Drimys winteri, Gevuina avellana, Ilex aquifolium, Quercus ilex, Vaccinium myrtillus, Hedera helix, Podocarpus salignas.

== Symptoms ==
Since Phytophthora kernoviae has such serious symptoms it should be seen as a serious threat to both trees and shrubs. On the shrubs of Rhododendron, the disease starts with the blackening of the leaf petiole sometimes extending to the base of the leaf, affecting old and young leaves equally. In addition to this darkening lesion on the stem, leaves can get severe enough lesions to become necrotic and cause entire leaf death. These lesions begin as a progressive blackening of the leaf tissue and spread across the leaf surface. In some cases this necrosis causes dieback and cankers on the infected plant. While symptoms for trees hosts are similar they have a few distinct differences. For the European beech (Fagus sylvatica) host symptoms include dark brown to blue black lesions on the trunk ranging in size and shape depending on severity of the infection. Tulip trees Liriodendron tulipifera are another susceptible host. The pathogen infects and causes many smaller bleeding lesions along the trunk and can even cause lesions on leaf tips. Both shrubs and trees share the characteristic symptoms of leaf necrosis with lesions on the stem and trunk proving the severity of this disease.

Diagnosis of the disease can be difficult as symptoms for Phytophthora ramorum and Phytophthora kernoviae can be very similar. One should test samples with DNA extraction of the plant tissue tested against conventional PCR and real-time PCR. If either of these tests come back negative you have a negative sample for P. kernoviae. While positive samples indicate the presence of this pathogen. In addition to this you can use isolation followed by morphological identification.

== Environment ==
Phytophthora kernoviae spreads most quickly and detrimentally in moist conditions such as direct rainfall and also those of heavy humidity. Rain and heavy winds help in the dispersal of spores for further infection. This disease has an optimal growing range of 26–16 °C (79–61 °F). This range suggests that it may have originated in a temperate climate, possibly China, Taiwan, the Himalayas, or even New Zealand before being introduced to the UK. While there are no known insect vectors for the disease, humans can transport spores via agricultural equipment, on shoe bottoms, and direct plant movement. These are the most significant vectors for the disease.

== Management ==
Since this disease has more recently been identified management practices are still developing. For best management it is most important to remove the sporulating plants in the area of infection. Along with this the clear cutting of trees or complete removal of shrub growth and thorough sanitation including removal of plant debris and leaves in infected area have been attempted to control the spread of the disease. Removal of standing water, properly timed watering and proper irrigation help to prevent the spread of spores through water. In areas of large infection bans can be placed on the removal of host plants and foliage from them. In addition to this bans on hiking trails can be enforced to manage spore transport through human activity. Anti-Phytophthora fungicides may be used in some cases, while these fungicides do not actually kill the organism but prevent it from becoming established or continued growth. Another method currently being used is controlling by culling Rhododendrons within diseased regions. In 2008, an infected Rhododendron ponticum was found in Ireland. More studies will need to be conducted in the spread and reproduction of this disease before more advanced chemical management methods become available.

== Life cycle ==
Phytophthora kernoviae can survive as an oospore, a thick walled resting structure and has been found to survive on infected plant tissues and in soil. Chlamydospores, long term resting structures that are seen in Phytophthora ramorum and other Phytophthora species are not observed in Phytophthora kernoviae. Production of sporangia, oospores, and zoospores were observed on Phytophthora kernoviae. Sporangia are only formed on hosts with susceptible foliage, trunk cankers have not exhibited sporulation and do not spread disease. This creates a simple life cycle for Phytophthora kernoviae. Oospores can germinate and create mouse-shaped sporangia. Sporangia serve as dispersal structures and create and release Zoospores, motile infectious spores. Once released, oospores germinate on the host and infect target host tissues. After infection if the conditions are correct, Phytophthora kernoviae produce sporangia that are dislodged by natural occurrences and spread to nearby plant tissue. In lab settings the production of these sporangia are documented within one week, with the sproangia present six days after inoculation causing documented disease in new plant tissues. The sporangia of Phytophthora kernoviae are spread locally through wind and water dispersion, infecting nearby susceptible tissues, long distance travel is occurs through the movement of infected plant tissues and in soil carried on vehicles, animals and footwear.

== Importance ==
Since 2003, Phytophthora kernoviae has caused marked damage to ornamentals and species of trees in the Southwest United Kingdom. The oomycete pathogen was first discovered in the 1990s, yet only gained widespread attention when it was identified as one of the causal agents, along with P. ramorum, of sudden oak death. Although the main concentration of this pathogen is primarily in South West England, its reach has extended to South Wales, Cheshire, and even further north into Scotland. Recently, this pathogen has been found on the stems and foliage of Rhododendron, most significantly on R. ponticum. Furthermore, the aggressive nature of Phytophthora kernoviae makes it an even more significant concern considering that the mainland of the UK has diverse ecosystems that are susceptible to the impact of this plant pathogen. From the Rhododendron host, infection is able to spread via the air to the bark of tree species, with the European beech tree (Fagus sylvatica) being especially susceptible. As of 2005, it was confined to a relatively small area of Cornwall but has also been found in Wales and Cheshire suggesting that the pathogen may be being spread by the horticultural trade. Due to the national and international demand of these plant products, Phytophthora kernoviae has initiated recent concern after being found Vaccinium myrtillus, commonly called Bilberry. This pathogen causes significant necrosis on leaves, bleeding stem lesions, and stem dieback as the primary symptoms, which occur at an impressive rate. Countless species including V. myrtillus, V. vitis-idaea, Arctostaphylos uva-ursi, and Rhododendron ponticum are all especially vulnerable to P. kernoviae.

== Pathogenesis ==
Phytophthora kernoviae infect through release and wind dispersal of zoospores. It is quick to take advantage of wounds already present on its host, but does not require the host to be injured. One interesting aspect of P. kernoviae is that in one study, only two thirds of typical infections were symptomatic, making it easy for this pathogen and infection to go unnoticed from typical visual inspection. Before infecting the inner bark of European beech trees, the pathogen causes leaf necrosis and the dieback of shoots in the under-foliage of the forest along with ornamental species. It is here where the sporulation occurs on the infected shoots and foliage, and is able to cause infection of the surrounding trees, giving rise to bleeding cankers on the stems. This pathogen's adaption for aerial dispersal is a key factor in its transmission from initial ornamental host to tree species.

Once on European beech trees, infected phloem will generally show bleeding lesions and discoloration. The color varies based on exposure to oxygen and elapsed time from infection. Often, these lesions will have pink or orange fluid-filled cavities called lagoons in the underlying phloem. The pathogen then occupies the xylem underneath the phloem lesions, which enables it to spread further throughout the vascular plant tissue and give rise to new phloem lesions. Furthermore, the pathogen present in the xylem leads to local dysfunction that furthers to damage the plant tissues, and move into previously healthy bark. Once P. kernoviae has penetrated the xylem, it can continue penetrating for well over 24 months. Tree mortality soon follows, in the matter of a few years from the initial time of infection.
