= Aspergillus waksmanii =

Scientific classification
- Kingdom: Fungi
- Division: Ascomycota
- Class: Eurotiomycetes
- Order: Eurotiales
- Family: Aspergillaceae
- Genus: Aspergillus
- Species: A. waksmanii

Binomial name
- Aspergillus waksmanii Hubka, S.W. Peterson, Frisvad & M. Kolarik (2013)

Type strain
- NRRL 179

Species of fungus

Aspergillus waksmanii is a homothallic species of fungus in the genus Aspergillus which has been isolated from soil from New Jersey in the United States. It is from the Fumigati section. Several fungi from this section produce heat-resistant ascospores, and the isolates from this section are frequently obtained from locations where natural fires have previously occurred. Aspergillus waksmanii produces apolar indoloterpenes.

== Growth and morphology ==
A. waksmanii has been cultivated on both Czapek yeast extract agar (CYA) plates and Malt Extract Agar Oxoid® (MEAOX) plates. The growth morphology of the colonies can be seen in the pictures below.

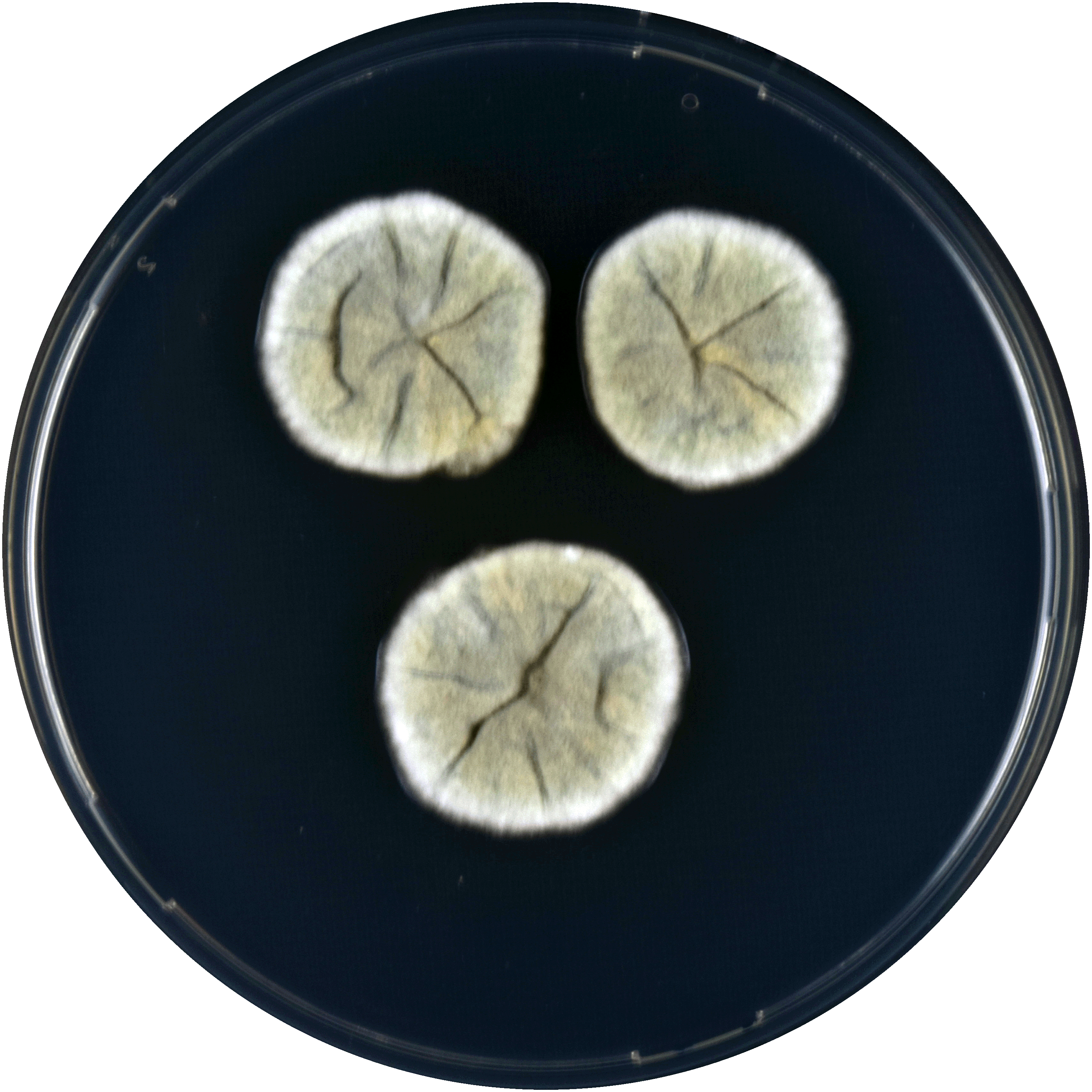
Aspergillus waksmanii growing on CYA plate

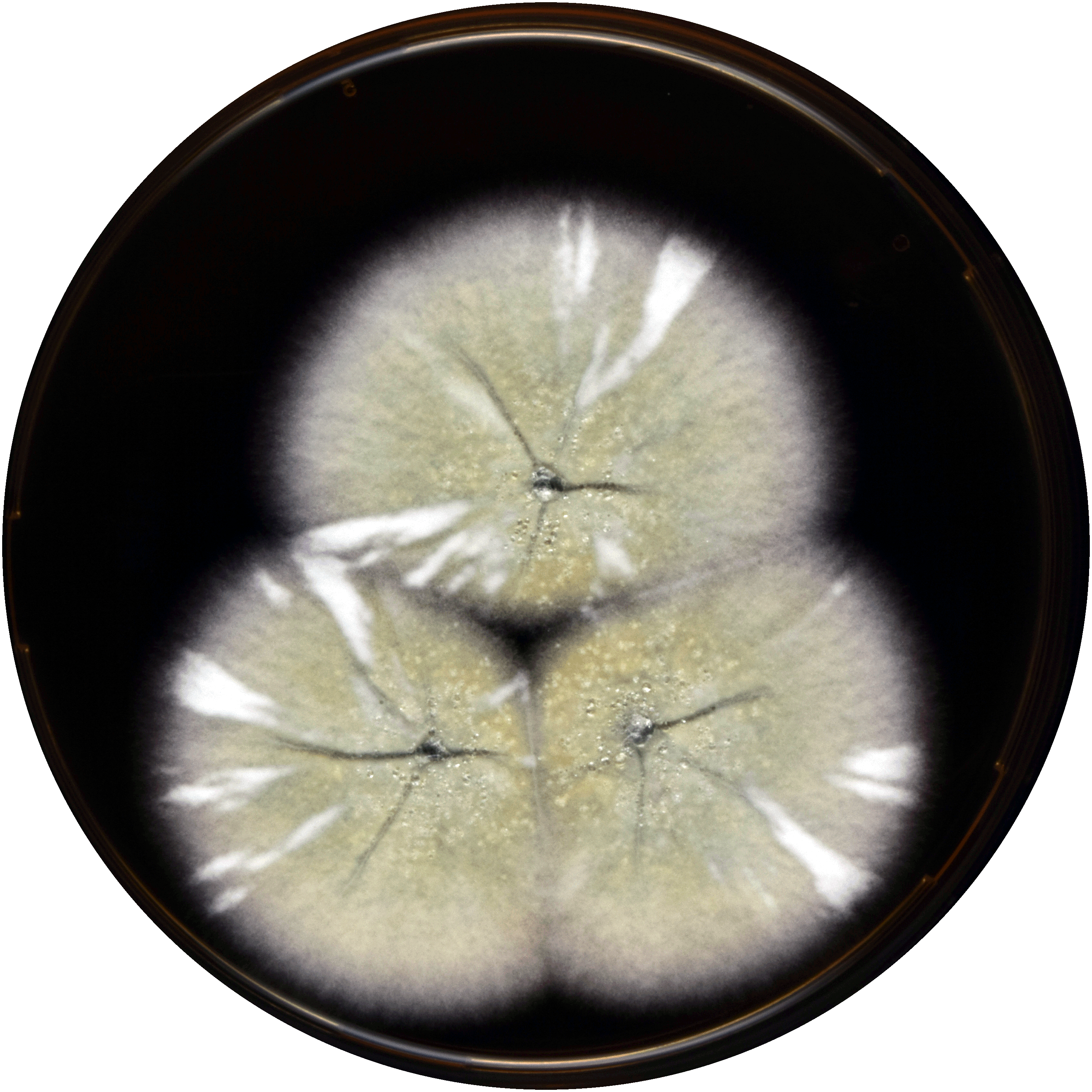
Aspergillus waksmanii growing on MEAOX plate
