= Phytophthora lacustris =

Scientific classification
- Domain: Eukaryota
- Clade: Sar
- Clade: Stramenopiles
- Phylum: Oomycota
- Class: Peronosporomycetes
- Order: Peronosporales
- Family: Peronosporaceae
- Genus: Phytophthora
- Species: P. lacustris

Binomial name
- Phytophthora lacustris Brasier, Cacciola, Nechwatal, Jung, & Bakonyi, 2012

Species of oomycete plant pathogen

Phytophthora lacustris is an oomycete plant pathogen.

== Hosts and symptoms ==
Phytophthora lacustris has a wide host range as well as a very wide geographical range, being found worldwide. Known hosts for P. lacustris include members of the genera Salix and Prunus. The genus Salix includes willow and poplar trees and the genus Prunus includes many economically important shrubs and trees such as peach, nectarine, cherry, almond, plum, and apricot. P. lacustris causes dieback in ash and alder trees. Other symptoms that are caused by P. lacustris include fine root damage as well as bark lesions.

== Disease cycle ==
Phytophthora lacustris is an oomycete that does not have a sexual life cycle, meaning the formation of oospores has not been observed. It also lacks chlamydospores. This means the only spores produced by P. lacustris are the asexual zoospores which are formed in the sporangia. It is an opportunistic pathogen with a wide range of allowable temperatures. This allows it to lay dormant in soil or water as well as cause latent infections in hosts for years, waiting for unfavorable host conditions to become symptomatic. Flooding or other forms of running water, such as irrigation canals, is favorable for the discharge and dispersal of zoospores from the sporangia which inoculate the host via the root system. P. lacustris has also been found to be a colonizer of dead plant material, showing saprotrophic characteristics.

== Environment ==
The optimal temperature for growth of P. lacustris on artificial media ranged from 28–33 °C, while the minimum and maximum temperatures for growth to occur were 2–4 °C and 36–37 °C respectively. This is significantly wider range than other taxonomically similar Phytophthora species. The wide tolerable temperature range that allows growth to occur allows P. lacustris to be present at a wide range of latitudes in nature. P. lacustris is an aquatic pathogen that disperses via natural and irrigation waterways. During inoculation method trials, P. lacustris was discovered to be more pathogenic when the host was inoculated through contaminated water in the root system than through an underbark inoculation. These results suggest that the presence of flooding is important for P. lacustris to be pathogenic. More evidence for this is that P. lacustris is often found in riparian habitats, or the area of land near a river or stream, which are susceptible to flooding.
