= Phytophthora gallica =

Scientific classification
- Domain: Eukaryota
- Clade: Sar
- Clade: Stramenopiles
- Phylum: Oomycota
- Class: Peronosporomycetes
- Order: Peronosporales
- Family: Peronosporaceae
- Genus: Phytophthora
- Species: P. gallica

Binomial name
- Phytophthora gallica Jung & Nechwatal, 2008

Species of single-celled organism

Phytophthora gallica is an oomycete. It produces globose and elongated irregular chlamydospores.
