= Phytophthora europaea =

Scientific classification
- Domain: Eukaryota
- Clade: Sar
- Clade: Stramenopiles
- Phylum: Oomycota
- Class: Peronosporomycetes
- Order: Peronosporales
- Family: Peronosporaceae
- Genus: Phytophthora
- Species: P. europaea

Binomial name
- Phytophthora europaea Thomas Jung et al., (2002)

Species of single-celled organism

Phytophthora europaea is a non-papillate homothallic plant pathogen that mainly infects European oak. It differs from other species of the genus (like P. fragariae) by producing oogonia with tapered bases, irregular walls and exclusively paragynous antheridia. It has also been found in the United States.
