= Phytophthora polonica =

Scientific classification
- Domain: Eukaryota
- Clade: Sar
- Clade: Stramenopiles
- Phylum: Oomycota
- Class: Peronosporomycetes
- Order: Peronosporales
- Family: Peronosporaceae
- Genus: Phytophthora
- Species: P. polonica

Binomial name
- Phytophthora polonica Belbahri et al., 2006

Species of single-celled organism

Phytophthora polonica is a non-papillate homothallic plant pathogen known to infect alder species.
