= Phytophthora pseudosyringae =

Scientific classification
- Domain: Eukaryota
- Clade: Sar
- Clade: Stramenopiles
- Phylum: Oomycota
- Class: Peronosporomycetes
- Order: Peronosporales
- Family: Peronosporaceae
- Genus: Phytophthora
- Species: P. pseudosyringae

Binomial name
- Phytophthora pseudosyringae T. Jung and T.I. Burgess, 2009

Species of single-celled organism

Phytophthora pseudosyringae is a semi-papillate homothallic soil-borne plant pathogen causing root and collar rot of broadleaf tree species in Europe. It is associated with necrotic fine roots and stem necroses of Fagus sylvatica and Alnus glutinosa, and isolates are moderately aggressive to fine roots of oaks and beech (Nothofagus), highly aggressive to holly leaves and apple fruits, and slightly pathogenic to alder bark. It belongs to the class of oomycetes and is often described as a ‘fungal-like’ organism since they form a heterotrophic mycelium as the ‘true fungi’, but in contrast, their cell wall lacks chitin and is composed only of cellulose and glucans.

Its name derives from Greek Phytophthora φυτόν (phytón), “plant” and φθορά (phthorá), “destruction”; “the plant-destroyer” and plurivora and from Latin (pluri = many, -vora = feeding).
