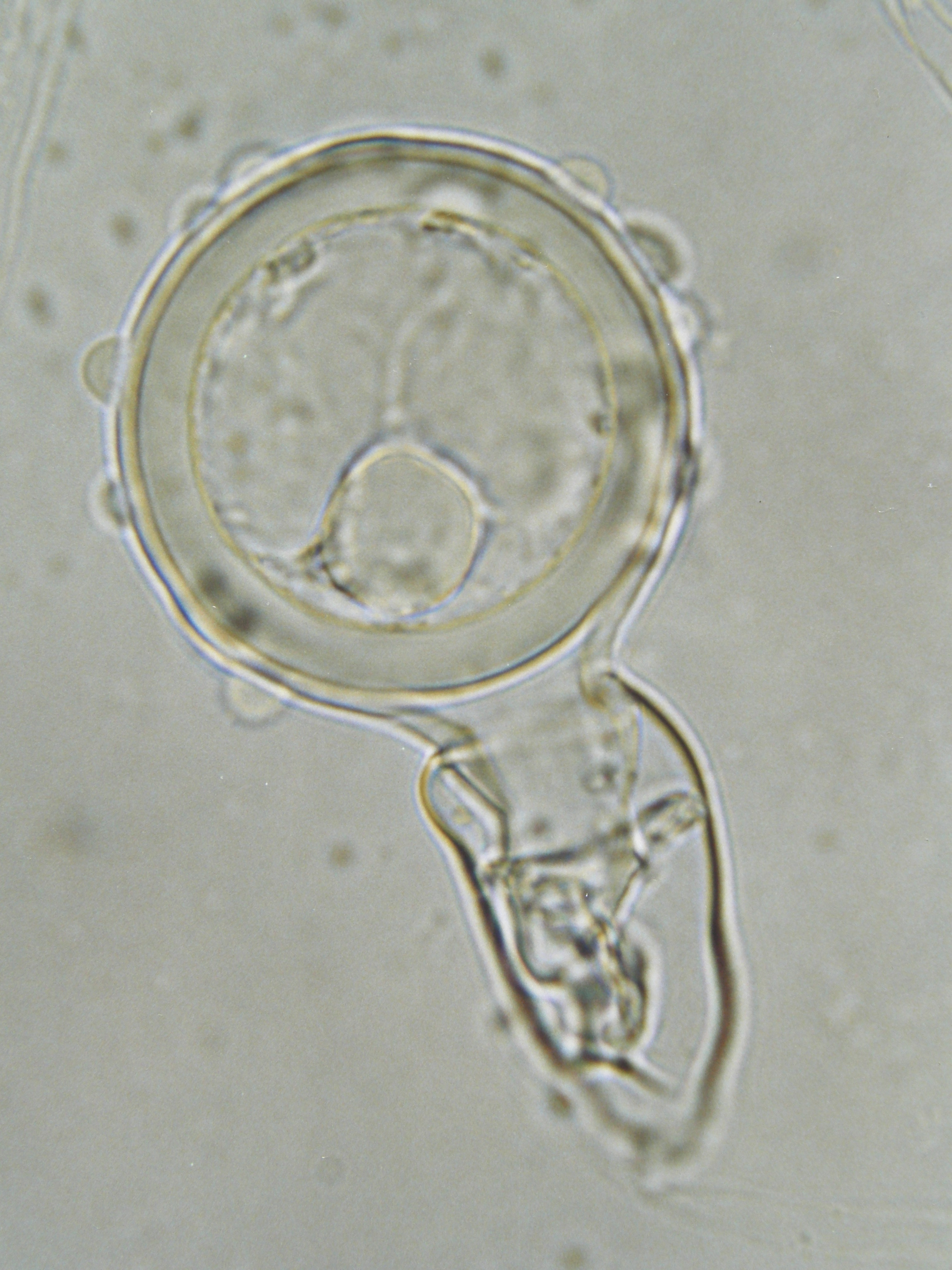

Scientific classification
- Domain: Eukaryota
- Clade: Sar
- Clade: Stramenopiles
- Division: Oomycota
- Class: Peronosporomycetes
- Order: Peronosporales
- Family: Peronosporaceae
- Genus: Phytophthora
- Species: P. × cambivora

Binomial name
- Phytophthora × cambivora (Petri) Buisman, (1927)

Synonyms
- Blepharospora cambivora Petri, (1917)

= Phytophthora cambivora =

Species of single-celled organism

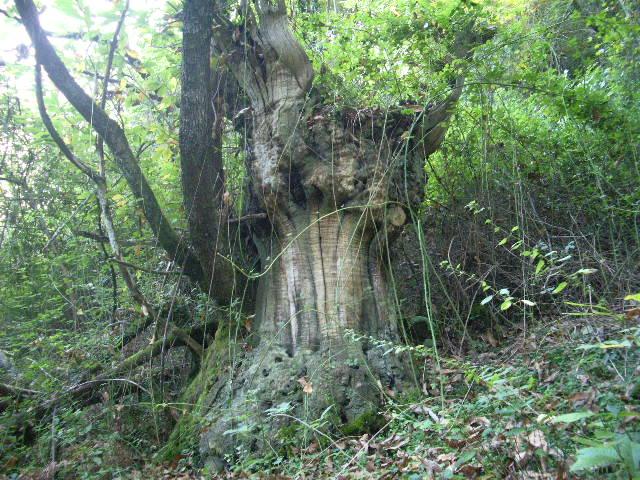
Castanea sativa affected by Phytophthora cambivora

Phytophthora × cambivora is a plant pathogen that causes ink disease in European chestnut trees (Castanea sativa). Ink disease, also caused by Phytophthora cinnamomi, is thought to have been present in Europe since the 18th century, and causes chestnut trees to wilt and die; major epidemics occurred during the 19th and 20th centuries.

Cinnamomi x cambivora are now present throughout Europe since the 1990s. Ink disease has resurged, often causing high mortality of trees, particularly in Portugal, Italy, and France. It has also been isolated from a number of different species since the 1990s, including:

- Golden chinquapin trees, (Chrysolepis chrysophylla) in Oregon, United States
- Rhododendron and Pieris species in North Carolina
- Noble fir trees (Abies procera) in Norway
- Beech trees (Fagus sylvatica) in Italy and Germany.

Some species of mycorrhiza (including Amanita muscaria, Suillellus luridus, and Hebeloma radicosum) may provide protection from P. cambivora in European chestnuts.

Phytophthora × cambivora appears to be a hybrid, although the parentage is currently unknown.

== See also ==
- Chestnut blight
- Phytophthora katsurae
- Forest pathology
- Wilt disease
