= Phytophthora psychrophila =

Scientific classification
- Domain: Eukaryota
- Clade: Sar
- Clade: Stramenopiles
- Phylum: Oomycota
- Class: Peronosporomycetes
- Order: Peronosporales
- Family: Peronosporaceae
- Genus: Phytophthora
- Species: P. psychrophila

Binomial name
- Phytophthora psychrophila Jung et al., (2002)

Species of single-celled organism

Phytophthora psychrophila is a semi-papillate plant pathogen that mainly infects European oak. It differs from other species of the genus (like P. ilicis) by its sympodially branched primary hyphae, the high variation in size and shape of the sporangia and shorter pedicels.
