= Phytophthora boehmeriae =

Scientific classification
- Domain: Eukaryota
- Clade: Sar
- Clade: Stramenopiles
- Phylum: Oomycota
- Class: Peronosporomycetes
- Order: Peronosporales
- Family: Peronosporaceae
- Genus: Phytophthora
- Species: P. boehmeriae

Binomial name
- Phytophthora boehmeriae Sawada, 1927

Species of single-celled organism

Phytophthora boehmeriae is an oomycete plant pathogen that causes disease on a wide range of host plants, including root rot of Mexican yellow pine and brown rot of Citrus fruits.
