= Phytophthora iranica =

Scientific classification
- Domain: Eukaryota
- Clade: Sar
- Clade: Stramenopiles
- Phylum: Oomycota
- Class: Peronosporomycetes
- Order: Peronosporales
- Family: Peronosporaceae
- Genus: Phytophthora
- Species: P. iranica

Binomial name
- Phytophthora iranica Caros. & Tucker, (1949)

Species of single-celled organism

Phytophthora iranica is a plant pathogen that infects the roots of Myrtle. It was discovered in a commercial nursery in Sardinia, Italy.
