= Phytophthora inflata =

Scientific classification
- Domain: Eukaryota
- Clade: Sar
- Clade: Stramenopiles
- Phylum: Oomycota
- Class: Peronosporomycetes
- Order: Peronosporales
- Family: Peronosporaceae
- Genus: Phytophthora
- Species: P. inflata

Binomial name
- Phytophthora inflata Caros. & Tucker, (1949)

Species of single-celled organism

Phytophthora inflata is an oomycete plant pathogen. It was first identified in 1949 in Michigan, USA causing a pit canker on elm trees. It was found in the United Kingdom in 1992 in the roots of Sambucus tenuifolium and Lilac (Syringa vulgaris), in 2003 it was found in a UK nursery infecting Rhododendron ponticum. In the same year it was found in a nursery in Ohio also infecting Rhododendron.
