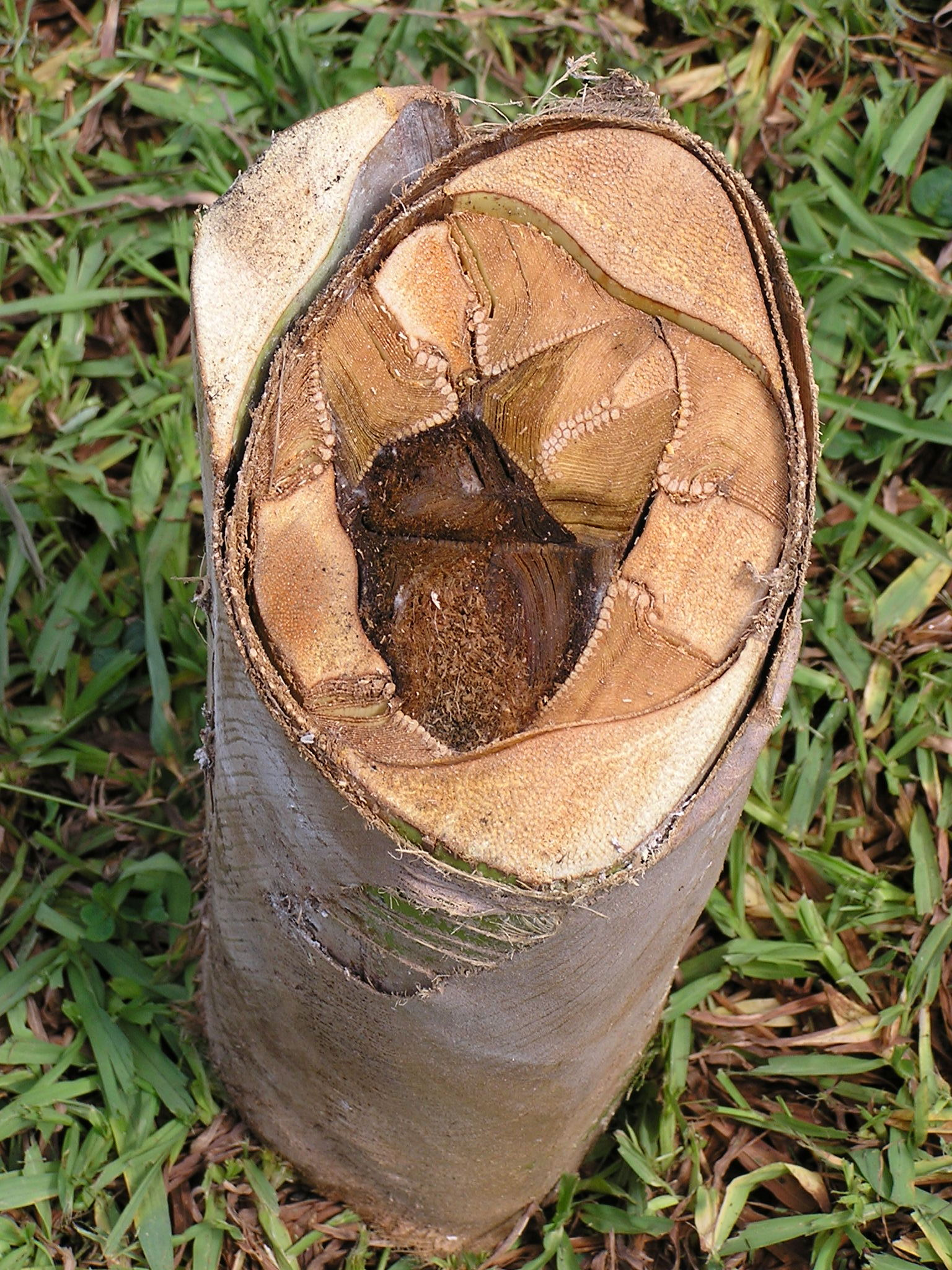
- Internal stem necrosis of Cocos nucifera due to coconut heart rot by P. katsurae

Scientific classification
- Domain: Eukaryota
- Clade: Sar
- Clade: Stramenopiles
- Phylum: Oomycota
- Class: Peronosporomycetes
- Order: Peronosporales
- Family: Peronosporaceae
- Genus: Phytophthora
- Species: P. katsurae

Binomial name
- Phytophthora katsurae W.H. Ko & H.S. Chang, (1979)

Synonyms
- Phytophthora castaneae Katsura & K. Uchida, (1976)

= Phytophthora katsurae =

Species of single-celled organism

Phytophthora katsurae (better-known as P. castaneae) is a plant pathogen. It was first isolated from chestnut (Castanea) trees in Japan. It has also been reported from Taiwan, Papua New Guinea, Australia and Korea.

== See also ==
- Chestnut blight
- Phytophthora cambivora
