= Phytophthora cajani =

Scientific classification
- Domain: Eukaryota
- Clade: Sar
- Clade: Stramenopiles
- Phylum: Oomycota
- Class: Peronosporomycetes
- Order: Peronosporales
- Family: Peronosporaceae
- Genus: Phytophthora
- Species: P. cajani

Binomial name
- Phytophthora cajani K.S. Amin, Baldev & F.J. Williams 1978

Species of single-celled organism

Phytophthora cajani is a species of water mould that infects pigeon pea (Cajanus cajan). It was first described in 1978.
