= Phytophthora citricola =

Scientific classification
- Domain: Eukaryota
- Clade: Sar
- Clade: Stramenopiles
- Phylum: Oomycota
- Class: Peronosporomycetes
- Order: Peronosporales
- Family: Peronosporaceae
- Genus: Phytophthora
- Species: P. citricola

Binomial name
- Phytophthora citricola Sawada, (1927)

Synonyms
- Phytophthora cactorum var. applanata Chester, (1932)

Species of single-celled organism

Phytophthora citricola is a plant pathogen. It was first described by Kaneyoshi (Kenkichi) Sawada in 1927 when it was isolated from orange trees in present-day Taiwan. It has since been found causing disease on a wide variety of plants.

== See also ==
- List of citrus diseases
