= Heterothallism =

Sexes that reside in different individuals

Heterothallic species have sexes that reside in different individuals. The term is applied particularly to distinguish heterothallic fungi, which require two compatible partners to produce sexual spores, from homothallic ones, which are capable of sexual reproduction from a single organism.

In heterothallic fungi, two different individuals contribute nuclei to form a zygote. Examples of heterothallism are included for Saccharomyces cerevisiae, Aspergillus fumigatus, Aspergillus flavus, Penicillium marneffei and Neurospora crassa. The heterothallic life cycle of N. crassa is given in some detail, since similar life cycles are present in other heterothallic fungi.

Certain heterothallic species (such as Neurospora tetrasperma) are called "pseudo-homothallic". Instead of separating into four individual spores by two meiosis events, only a single meiosis occurs, resulting in two spores, each with two haploid nuclei of different mating types (those of its parents). This results in a spore which can mate with itself (intratetrad mating, automixis).

== Life cycle of Saccharomyces cerevisiae ==
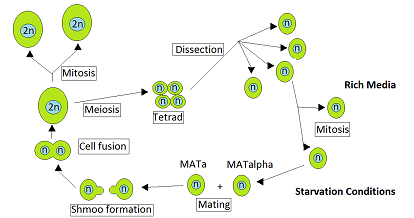
Saccharomyces cerevisiae tetrad

The yeast Saccharomyces cerevisiae is heterothallic. This means that each yeast cell is of a certain mating type and can only mate with a cell of the other mating type. During vegetative growth that ordinarily occurs when nutrients are abundant, S. cerevisiae reproduces by mitosis as either haploid or diploid cells. However, when starved, diploid cells undergo meiosis to form haploid spores. Mating occurs when haploid cells of opposite mating type, MATa and MATα, come into contact. Ruderfer et al. pointed out that such contacts are frequent between closely related yeast cells for two reasons. The first is that cells of opposite mating type are present together in the same ascus, the sac that contains the tetrad of cells directly produced by a single meiosis, and these cells can mate with each other. The second reason is that haploid cells of one mating type, upon cell division, often produce cells of the opposite mating type with which they may mate.

Katz Ezov et al. presented evidence that in natural S. cerevisiae populations clonal reproduction and a type of "self-fertilization" (in the form of intratetrad mating) predominate. Ruderfer et al. analyzed the ancestry of natural S. cerevisiae strains and concluded that outcrossing occurs only about once every 50,000 cell divisions. Thus, although S. cerevisiae is heterothallic, it appears that, in nature, mating is most often between closely related yeast cells. The relative rarity in nature of meiotic events that result from outcrossing suggests that the possible long-term benefits of outcrossing (e.g. generation of genetic diversity) are unlikely to be sufficient for generally maintaining sex from one generation to the next. Rather, a short-term benefit, such as meiotic recombinational repair of DNA damages caused by stressful conditions such as starvation may be the key to the maintenance of sex in S. cerevisiae.

== Life cycle of Aspergillus fumigatus ==
Aspergillus fumigatus, is a heterothallic fungus. It is one of the most common Aspergillus species to cause disease in humans with an immunodeficiency. A. fumigatus, is widespread in nature, and is typically found in soil and decaying organic matter, such as compost heaps, where it plays an essential role in carbon and nitrogen recycling. Colonies of the fungus produce from conidiophores thousands of minute grey-green conidia (2–3 μm) that readily become airborne. A. fumigatus possesses a fully functional sexual reproductive cycle that leads to the production of cleistothecia and ascospores.

Although A. fumigatus occurs in areas with widely different climates and environments, it displays low genetic variation and lack of population genetic differentiation on a global scale. Thus the capability for heterothallic sex is maintained even though little genetic diversity is produced. As in the case of S. cereviae, above, a short-term benefit of meiosis may be the key to the adaptive maintenance of sex in this species.

== Life cycle of Aspergillus flavus ==
A. flavus is the major producer of carcinogenic aflatoxins in crops worldwide. It is also an opportunistic human and animal pathogen, causing aspergillosis in immunocompromised individuals. In 2009, a sexual state of this heterothallic fungus was found to arise when strains of opposite mating type were cultured together under appropriate conditions.Sexuality generates diversity in the aflatoxin gene cluster in A. flavus, suggesting that production of genetic variation may contribute to the maintenance of heterothallism in this species.

== Life cycle of Talaromyces marneffei ==
Henk et al. showed that the genes required for meiosis are present in T. marneffei, and that mating and genetic recombination occur in this species.

Henk et al. concluded that T. marneffei is sexually reproducing, but recombination in natural populations is most likely to occur across spatially and genetically limited distances resulting in a highly clonal population structure. Sex is maintained in this species even though very little genetic variability is produced. Sex may be maintained in T. marneffei by a short-term benefit of meiosis, as in S. cerevisiae and A. fumigatus, discussed above.

== Life cycle of Neurospora crassa ==
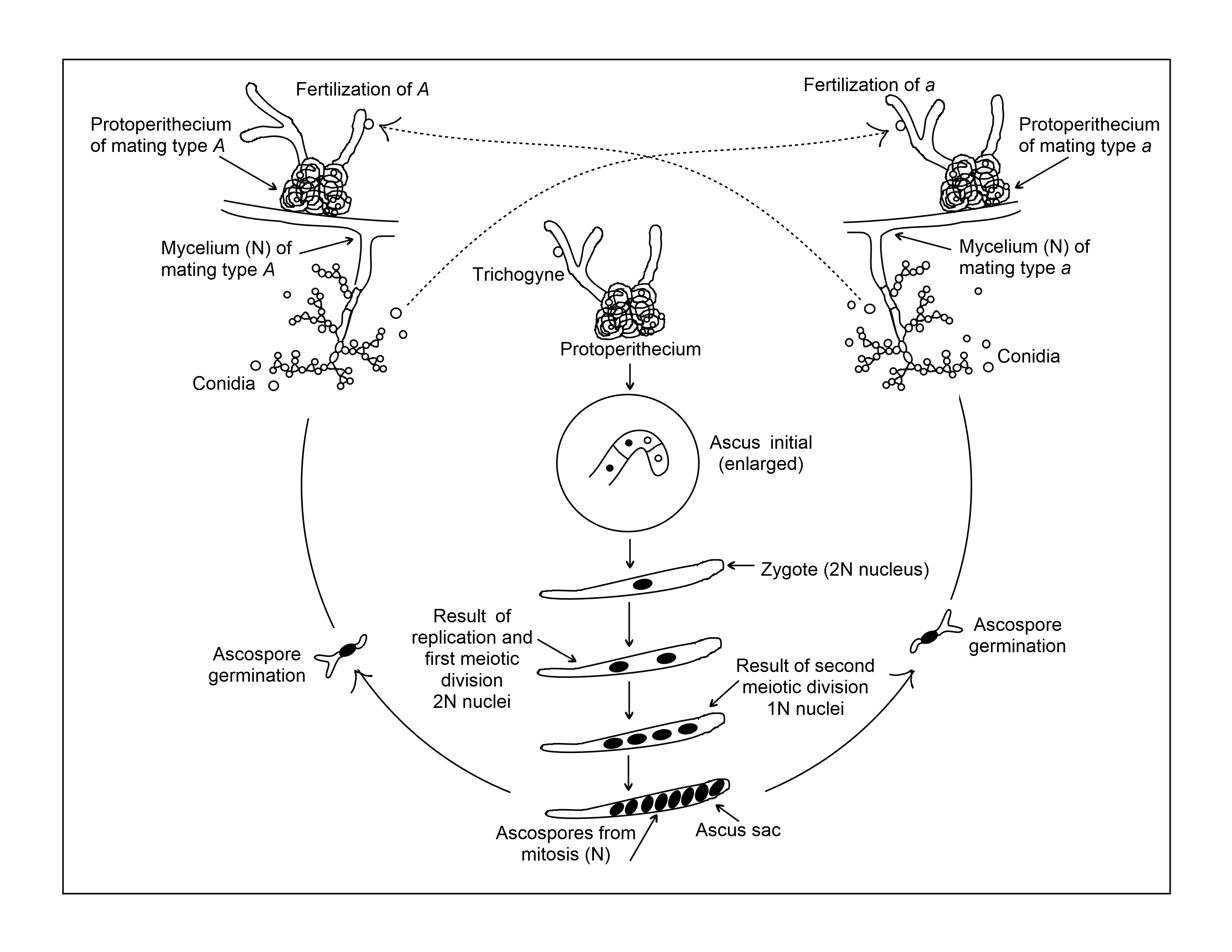
Neurospora crassa life cycle. The haploid mycelium reproduces asexually by two processes: (1) simple proliferation of existing mycelium, and (2) formation of conidia (macro- and micro-) which can be dispersed and then germinate to produce new mycelium. In the sexual cycle, mating can only occur between individual strains of different mating type, 'A' and 'a'. Fertilization occurs by the passage of nuclei of conidia or mycelium of one mating type into the protoperithecia of the opposite mating type through the trichogyne. Fusion of the nuclei of opposite mating types occurs within the protoperithecium to form a zygote (2N) nucleus.

The sexual cycle of N. crassa is heterothallic. Sexual fruiting bodies (perithecia) can only be formed when two mycelia of different mating type come together. Like other ascomycetes, N. crassa has two mating types that, in this case, are symbolized by 'A' and 'a'. There is no evident morphological difference between the 'A' and 'a' mating type strains. Both can form abundant protoperithecia, the female reproductive structure (see figure, top of §). Protoperithecia are formed most readily in the laboratory when growth occurs on solid (agar) synthetic medium with a relatively low source of nitrogen. Nitrogen starvation appears to be necessary for expression of genes involved in sexual development. The protoperithecium consists of an ascogonium, a coiled multicellular hypha that is enclosed in a knot-like aggregation of hyphae. A branched system of slender hyphae, called the trichogyne, extends from the tip of the ascogonium projecting beyond the sheathing hyphae into the air. The sexual cycle is initiated (i.e. fertilization occurs) when a cell (usually a conidium) of opposite mating type contacts a part of the trichogyne (see figure, top of §). Such contact can be followed by cell fusion leading to one or more nuclei from the fertilizing cell migrating down the trichogyne into the ascogonium. Since both 'A' and 'a' strains have the same sexual structures, neither strain can be regarded as exclusively male or female. However, as a recipient, the protoperithecium of both the 'A' and 'a' strains can be thought of as the female structure, and the fertilizing conidium can be thought of as the male participant.

The subsequent steps following fusion of 'A' and 'a' haploid cells, have been outlined by Fincham and Day, and by Wagner and Mitchell. After fusion of the cells, the further fusion of their nuclei is delayed. Instead, a nucleus from the fertilizing cell and a nucleus from the ascogonium become associated and begin to divide synchronously. The products of these nuclear divisions (still in pairs of unlike mating type, i.e. 'A' / 'a') migrate into numerous ascogenous hyphae, which then begin to grow out of the ascogonium. Each of these ascogenous hypha bends to form a hook (or crozier) at its tip and the 'A' and 'a' pair of haploid nuclei within the crozier divide synchronously. Next, septa form to divide the crozier into three cells. The central cell in the curve of the hook contains one 'A' and one 'a' nucleus (see figure, top of §). This binuclear cell initiates ascus formation and is called an "ascus-initial" cell. Next the two uninucleate cells on either side of the first ascus-forming cell fuse with each other to form a binucleate cell that can grow to form a further crozier that can then form its own ascus-initial cell. This process can then be repeated multiple times.

After formation of the ascus-initial cell, the 'A' and 'a' nucleus fuse with each other to form a diploid nucleus (see figure, top of §). This nucleus is the only diploid nucleus in the entire life cycle of N. crassa. The diploid nucleus has 14 chromosomes formed from the two fused haploid nuclei that had 7 chromosomes each. Formation of the diploid nucleus is immediately followed by meiosis. The two sequential divisions of meiosis lead to four haploid nuclei, two of the 'A' mating type and two of the 'a' mating type. One further mitotic division leads to four 'A' and four 'a' nuclei in each ascus. Meiosis is an essential part of the life cycle of all sexually reproducing organisms, and in its main features, meiosis in N. crassa seems typical of meiosis generally.

As the above events are occurring, the mycelial sheath that had enveloped the ascogonium develops as the wall of the perithecium, becomes impregnated with melanin, and blackens. The mature perithecium has a flask-shaped structure.

A mature perithecium may contain as many as 300 asci, each derived from identical fusion diploid nuclei. Ordinarily, in nature, when the perithecia mature the ascospores are ejected rather violently into the air. These ascospores are heat resistant and, in the lab, require heating at 60 °C for 30 minutes to induce germination. For normal strains, the entire sexual cycle takes 10 to 15 days. In a mature ascus containing 8 ascospores, pairs of adjacent spores are identical in genetic constitution, since the last division is mitotic, and since the ascospores are contained in the ascus sac that holds them in a definite order determined by the direction of nuclear segregations during meiosis. Since the four primary products are also arranged in sequence, the pattern of genetic markers from a first-division segregation can be distinguished from the markers from a second-division segregation pattern.

== See also ==
- Mating of yeast
- Dioecy, a similar property in plants
