= Chlamydospore =

Cell type of fungi

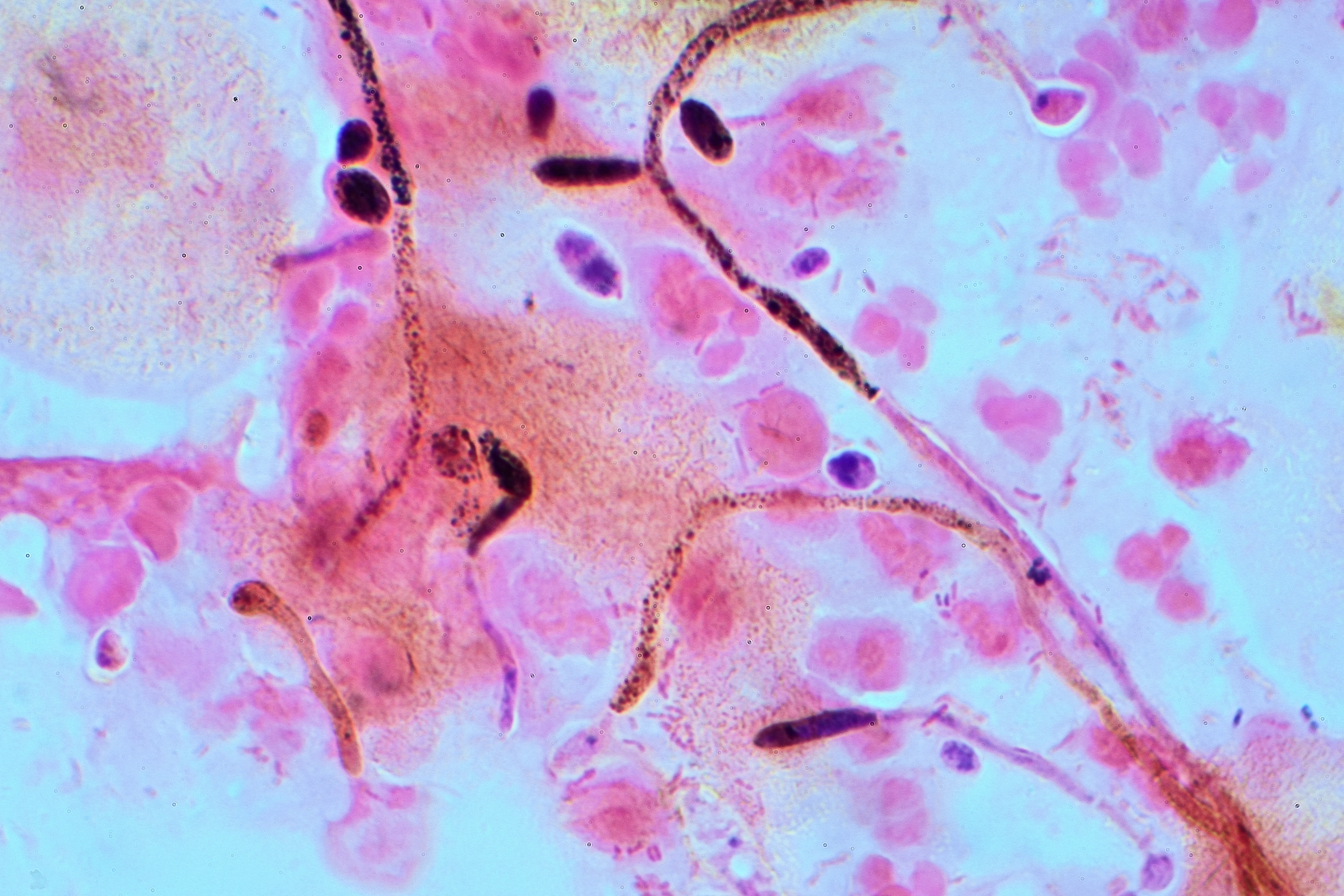
Gram stain of Candida albicans from a vaginal swab, showing hyphae, and chlamydospores, which are 2–4 μm in diameter.

A chlamydospore is the thick-walled large resting spore of several kinds of fungi, including Ascomycota such as Candida, Basidiomycota such as Panus, and various Mortierellales species. It is the life-stage which survives in unfavourable conditions, such as dry or hot seasons. Fusarium oxysporum which causes the plant disease Fusarium wilt is one which forms chlamydospores in response to stresses like nutrient depletion. Mycelia of the pathogen can survive in this manner and germinate in favorable conditions.

Chlamydospores are usually dark-coloured, spherical, and have a smooth (non-ornamented) surface. They are multicellular, with cells connected by pores in the septae between cells.

Chlamydospores are a result of asexual reproduction (in which case they are conidia called chlamydoconidia) or sexual reproduction (rare). Teliospores are special kind of chlamydospores formed by rusts and smuts.

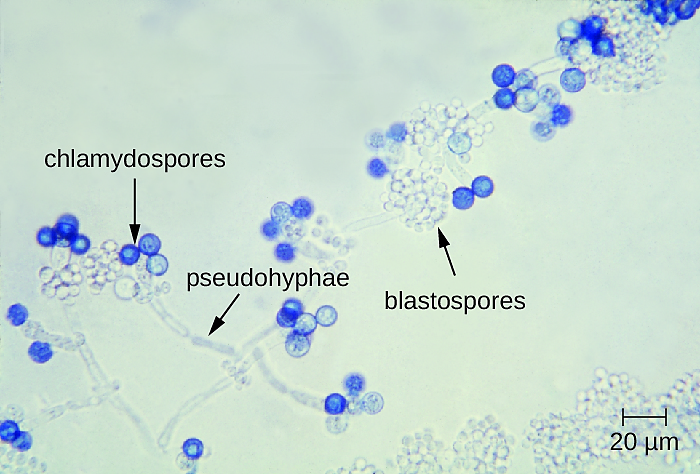
Pseudohyphae, chlamydospores and blastospores of Candida yeast.

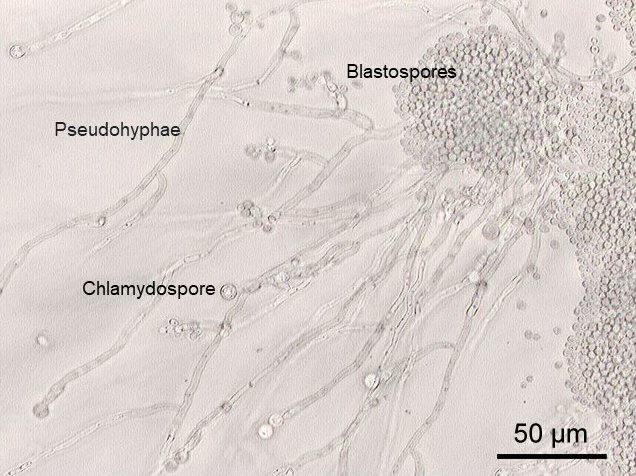
Chlamydospores of the yeast Candida albicans

== See also ==
- Conidium
- Resting spore
- Zygospore
