= Homothallism =

Genetic trait in fungi and algae

In fungi and algae, homothallism refers to the condition in which a single individual or thallus carries the genetic determinants (i.e., both mating types or sexes) required to undergo sexual reproduction without the need for a distinct mating partner. The opposite sexual functions are performed by different cells of a single mycelium. This is in contrast to can be contrasted to heterothallism, in which each cell is self-infertile, and requires interaction with a cell of the opposite mating type in order to complete sexual reproduction.

It is often used to categorize fungi. In yeast, heterothallic cells have mating types a and α. An experienced mother cell (one that has divided at least once) will switch mating type every cell division cycle because of the HO allele.

Sexual reproduction commonly occurs in two fundamentally different ways in fungi. These are outcrossing (in heterothallic fungi) in which two different individuals contribute nuclei to form a zygote, and self-fertilization or selfing (in homothallic fungi) in which both nuclei are derived from the same individual. Homothallism in fungi can be defined as the capability of an individual spore to produce a sexually reproducing colony when propagated in isolation. Homothallism occurs in fungi by a wide variety of genetically distinct mechanisms that all result in sexually reproducing cultures from a single cell.

Among the 250 known species of aspergilli, about 36% have an identified sexual state. Among those Aspergillus species for which a sexual cycle has been observed, the majority in nature are homothallic (self-fertilizing). Selfing in the homothallic fungus Aspergillus nidulans involves activation of the same mating pathways characteristic of sex in outcrossing species, i.e. self-fertilization does not bypass required pathways for outcrossing sex but instead requires activation of these pathways within a single individual. Fusion of haploid nuclei occurs within reproductive structures termed cleistothecia, in which the diploid zygote undergoes meiotic divisions to yield haploid ascospores.

Several ascomycete fungal species of the genus Cochliobolus (C. luttrellii, C. cymbopogonis, C. kusanoi and C. homomorphus) are homothallic. The ascomycete fungus Pneumocystis jirovecii is considered to be primarily homothallic. The ascomycete fungus Neosartorya fischeri is also homothallic. Cryptococcus depauperatus, a homothallic basidiomycete fungus, grows as long, branching filaments (hyphae). C. depauperatus can undergo meiosis and reproduce sexually with itself throughout its life cycle.

A lichen is a composite organism consisting of a fungus and a photosynthetic partner that are growing together in a symbiotic relationship. The photosynthetic partner is usually either a green alga or a cyanobacterium. Lichens occur in some of the most extreme environments on Earth—arctic tundra, hot deserts, rocky coasts, and toxic slag heaps. Most lichenized fungi produce abundant sexual structures and in many species sexual spores appear to be the only means of dispersal (Murtagh et al., 2000). The lichens Graphis scripta and Ochrolechia parella do not produce symbiotic vegetative propagules. Rather the lichen-forming fungi of these species reproduce sexually by self-fertilization (i.e. they are homothallic), and it was proposed that this breeding system allows successful reproduction in harsh environments (Murtagh et al., 2000). Homothallism appears to be common in natural populations of fungi. Although self-fertilization employs meiosis, it produces minimal genetic variability. Homothallism is thus a form of sex that is unlikely to be adaptively maintained by a benefit related to producing variability. However, homothallic meiosis may be maintained in fungi as an adaptation for surviving stressful conditions; a proposed benefit of meiosis is the promoted homologous meiotic recombinational repair of DNA damages that are ordinarily caused by a stressful environment.

== Evolution ==
Homothallism evolved repeatedly from heterothallism.

== See also ==
- Mating of yeast
- Hermaphroditism
