= Backusella macrospora =

Scientific classification
- Domain: Eukaryota
- Kingdom: Fungi
- Division: Mucoromycota
- Class: Mucoromycetes
- Order: Mucorales
- Family: Backusellaceae
- Genus: Backusella
- Species: B. macrospora

Binomial name
- Backusella macrospora Urquhart & Douch

Species of fungus

Backusella macrospora is a species of zygote fungus in the order Mucorales. It was described by Andrew S. Urquhart and James K. Douch in 2020. The specific epithet refers to the large size of the sporangiospores. The type locality is Tarra-Bulga National Park, Australia.

== See also ==
- Fungi of Australia
