= Backusella mclennaniae =

Scientific classification
- Kingdom: Fungi
- Division: Mucoromycota
- Class: Mucoromycetes
- Order: Mucorales
- Family: Backusellaceae
- Genus: Backusella
- Species: B. mclennaniae

Binomial name
- Backusella mclennaniae Urquhart & Douch

Species of fungus

Backusella mclennaniae is a species of zygote fungus in the order Mucorales. It was described by Andrew S. Urquhart and James K. Douch in 2020. The specific epithet is in honour of Australian mycologist Ethel Irene McLennan. The type locality is Morwell National Park, Australia.

== See also ==
- Fungi of Australia
