= Umbelopsis ramanniana =

Scientific classification
- Kingdom: Fungi
- Division: Mucoromycota
- Class: Mucoromycetes
- Order: Mucorales
- Family: Umbelopsidaceae
- Genus: Umbelopsis
- Species: U. ramanniana

Binomial name
- Umbelopsis ramanniana (Möller) W.Gams

Fungal Species

Umbelopsis ramanniana is a common and abundant soil fungus. Although the ecological role of this fungus in natural ecosystems is not yet known, it is a cosmopolitan saprotroph in soil, forest leaf litter, in animal dung, and on the spore-producing bodies of ascomycete fungi. Umbelopsis ramanniana has also been found growing as an endophyte within xylem tissue of both healthy and declining conifers, but its exact effect on the plant hosts is unknown. Umbelopsis ramanniana is a representative of a unique group of zygomycete fungi that is distinct from the Mucoromycotina and Mortierellomycotina and instead forms an early diverging lineage within the Mucoralean fungi. Umbelopsis ramanniana is important from a biochemistry and biotechnology perspective because it is highly tolerant to fungicides of benomyl group, and it is oleaginous (it regularly produces oils). Expression of Umbelopsis ramanniana diacylglycerol O-acyltransferase 2A in seed increases oil in soybean without reduction of other important yield parameters. This increase in oil can potentially add over $1 billion to the annual value of soybean crops.

== Morphology ==
The species is a part of a complex phylogeny and classification, but the group this species is in differs from others in the order Mucorales by their sporangial structure, their spore shape and size, as well as in their dichotomously branched hyphae.

The sporangial structure is generally branched, producing sympodially proliferated sporangiospores. The spores are tinted pink (though some discussion has been on whether the pigmentations come from the spores, the sporangium itself, or even from the spore drop from the evanescent sporangial wall).

Another characteristic morphological feature is the variation of the sporangiospore shape and size. The shapes vary from subglobose, rounded oblong, and ellipsoidal. The spore sizes vary from 2.2-3.9 μm by 1.3-2.0 μm. The wide ranges are characteristic of the species, but the three sub clades have been shown to account for that difference, each with their own ranges (Ogawa et al. 2005). The variation in the spore shape is thought to be a result of packing spores in a rigid sporangial wall. This prevents the development of round spores when they come to maturity, though differences in this effect are seen throughout the subclades (Tokumasu et al. 1990). U. ramanniana has been observed to have microchlamydospores, ranging from 4.9 ± 0.4 – 9.1 ± 0.8 μm, as well as the potential for macrochlamydospores, though not observed in all subclades. The chlamydospores have been observed to be filled with lipids. Umbelopsis ramanniana is not known to form any sexual structures, and are lacking in zygospores.

The species is further characterized by its velvety colonies, a rudimentary columella being subglobose to flattened, and is lacking in the garlic-like odor that is common in the Mortierella isabellina-Group that U. ramanniana was originally thought to belong to.

== General ecology ==
As of today, the exact ecological role of this fungus is not completely understood. It is a common soil saprobe, but has also been observed in other locations. It has been recorded in Great Britain, Hong Kong, Ireland, Kerala, Mauritius, New Zealand North, Ontario, Peninsular Malaysia, Queensland, Sri Lanka, Sweden, Victoria, and throughout the US. The most prevalent studies have shown Umbelopsis ramanniana to be present in leaf litter, animal dung, on the roots and within the xylem of some conifers, and on spore producing bodies of some ascomycetes including the ascocarp of Peziza species.

Specifically, in reference to the roots and xylem tissue of some trees, it has been observed within the soil in the root zone, with an affinity for fine roots, as well as within root core samples as an endophyte of certain conifers, including Picea abies and the Ponderosa pine. A study by Hoff et al. in 2004 researched the soil mycology before and after a change in the soil environment, in this case a forest fire, to see how the fungal populations changed. U. ramanniana was one of the first to bounce back, with affinity for the ponderosa pine, leading the authors to believe that it is a common endophyte and soil saprobe that is favored by disturbance in a dry environment.

Also, the spores of U. ramanniana have been found on the bodies of mites, along with many other genera. There seems to be no apparent symbiosis. It simply seems that the spores hitch a ride, and the mite is a simple vector for the spore dispersal of multiple ubiquitous fungi.

== Human relevance ==
Umbelopsis ramanniana is quite relevant to biology and human activity today due to both its high tolerance to benomyl group fungicides, and the oleaginous nature of the fungus. When isolating fungi from field or mixed samples, scientists often use an isolating medium containing benomyl fungicides, which constrict the growth of some fungi while having little to no effect on other genera. This allows for preferential colonization and the isolation of different strains for identification and research purposes. With U. ramanniana’s tolerance to this medium, it is more easily isolated, identified, and cultured for research and production purposes.

Beyond its ease of isolation and culture, the fungus is also oleaginous – it produces oil. It contains the gene diacylglycerol acyltransferase 2A, which is what codes for the oil production. Scientists have created a codon-optimized version of this gene that is introduced into soybeans and maize in order to increase the oil content of the oilseeds. Soybean production and processing alone accounts for 30% of vegetable oil used for food, feed, and industrial applications. It is first on the list of sources of lipids in food and biofuels, with maize coming in second. In these crops, most often there is an inverse relationship between oil and both protein and yield. As oil content is increased, yield and protein levels decrease. This is undesirable in large scale production, but the invention of the oil transgene allows produces to modulate one pathway without affecting the other. In soybeans, this gene increased oil content 1.5% by weight in mature seed, without any decrease in yield or protein synthesis. This is a huge step forward for the oilseed industry.

== Taxonomy and phylogeny ==
Umbelopsis ramanniana was first described by MÖLLER in 1903 under the name Mucor ramannianus, however today it is classified as Umbelopsis ramanniana (MÖLLER) W. Gams 2003. The name has gone through many changes from MÖLLER to Gams, and synonyms of Umbelopsis ramanniana include: Micromucor ramannianus (MÖLLER) Arx 1984, Mucor ramannianus MÖLLER 1903, Mortierella ramanniana (MÖLLER) Linnem 1941, Mortierella ramanniana var. ramanniana (MÖLLER) Linnem 1941, Mucor ramannianus var. ramannianus MÖLLER 1903, and Micromucor ramannianus var. ramannianus (MÖLLER) Arx 1984. As of today, there are no well-known or preferred common names.

U. ramanniana's classification is structured as follows: fungi > Zygomycota > not assigned > Mucorales > Umbelopsidaceae > Umbelopsis > U. ramanniana. It was originally through to be in the Mucoromycotina, however through genetic analysis has now been separated from it as well as Mortierellomycotina. It has two varieties that have been determined by its variable sporangial and zygospore structures; these two varieties are U. ramanniana var. ramanniana, and U. ramanniana var. angulispora. The latter is described as a variety due to the angular shape of its spores, thought to be due to the pressure of the rigid sporangial wall.

The order Mucorales was first studied by scientists in the late 1800s, with a large amount of that research being done in Europe, but some in the southeastern United States. The zygomycete Umbelopsis ramanniana was first located as a ubiquitous soil saprobe in these areas of the world, as well as found in dung. As of today, it is recognized as within a polyphyletic group of Umbelopsis, but is thought to comprise three different intraspecific groups, based on genetic and phylogenetic research. Multiple phylogenetic trees have been created and published to show both the characterization of U. ramanniana and the three sub-clades.
