= Backusella westeae =

Scientific classification
- Kingdom: Fungi
- Division: Mucoromycota
- Class: Mucoromycetes
- Order: Mucorales
- Family: Backusellaceae
- Genus: Backusella
- Species: B. westeae

Binomial name
- Backusella westeae Urquhart & Douch

Species of fungus

Backusella westeae is a species of zygote fungus in the order Mucorales. It was described by Andrew S. Urquhart and James K. Douch in 2020. The specific epithet is in honour of mycologist Gretna Margaret Weste. The type locality is Tarra-Bulga National Park, Australia, from which the type specimen was inadvertently isolated from a Laccaria basidiome.

== See also ==
- Fungi of Australia
