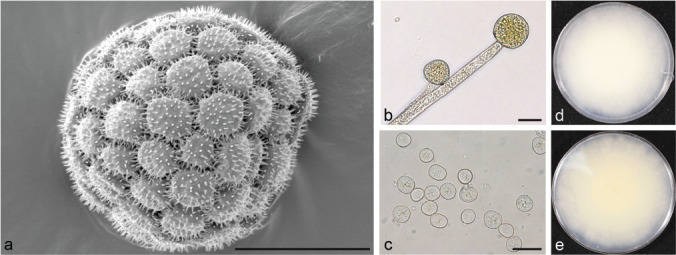
- Backusella australiensis specimens viewed under varying magnifications.

Scientific classification
- Kingdom: Fungi
- Division: Mucoromycota
- Class: Mucoromycetes
- Order: Mucorales
- Family: Backusellaceae
- Genus: Backusella
- Species: B. australiensis

Binomial name
- Backusella australiensis Urquhart & Douch

= Backusella australiensis =

Species of fungus

Backusella australiensis is a species of zygote fungus in the order Mucorales. It was described by Andrew S. Urquhart and James K. Douch in 2020. The specific epithet refers to Australia, the country from which the type specimen was collected. The type locality is Morwell National Park.

== See also ==
- Fungi of Australia
