= Backusella liffmaniae =

Scientific classification
- Kingdom: Fungi
- Division: Mucoromycota
- Class: Mucoromycetes
- Order: Mucorales
- Family: Backusellaceae
- Genus: Backusella
- Species: B. liffmaniae

Binomial name
- Backusella liffmaniae Urquhart & Douch

Species of fungus

Backusella liffmaniae is a species of zygote fungus in the order Mucorales. It was described by Andrew S. Urquhart and James K. Douch in 2020. The specific epithet is in honour of Patricia Liffman, who contributed to the protection of ex-type locality. The type locality is Jack Cann Reserve, Australia.

== See also ==
- Fungi of Australia
