= Backusella morwellensis =

Scientific classification
- Domain: Eukaryota
- Kingdom: Fungi
- Division: Mucoromycota
- Class: Mucoromycetes
- Order: Mucorales
- Family: Backusellaceae
- Genus: Backusella
- Species: B. morwellensis

Binomial name
- Backusella morwellensis Urquhart & Douch

Species of fungus

Backusella morwellensis is a species of zygote fungus in the order Mucorales. It was described by Andrew S. Urquhart and James K. Douch in 2020. The specific epithet refers to the type locality; Morwell National Park, Australia.

== See also ==
- Fungi of Australia
