= Backusella luteola =

Scientific classification
- Kingdom: Fungi
- Division: Mucoromycota
- Class: Mucoromycetes
- Order: Mucorales
- Family: Backusellaceae
- Genus: Backusella
- Species: B. luteola

Binomial name
- Backusella luteola Urquhart & Douch

Species of fungus

Backusella luteola is a species of zygote fungus in the order Mucorales. It was described by Andrew S. Urquhart and James K. Douch in 2020. The specific epithet refers to the yellow colony colouration. The type locality is Jack Cann Reserve, Australia.

== See also ==
- Fungi of Australia
