= Backusella parvicylindrica =

Scientific classification
- Domain: Eukaryota
- Kingdom: Fungi
- Division: Mucoromycota
- Class: Mucoromycetes
- Order: Mucorales
- Family: Backusellaceae
- Genus: Backusella
- Species: B. parvicylindrica

Binomial name
- Backusella parvicylindrica Urquhart & Douch

Species of fungus

Backusella parvicylindrica is a species of zygote fungus in the order Mucorales. It was described by Andrew S. Urquhart and James K. Douch in 2020. The specific epithet is from Latin parvus (small) and Greek kylindros (cylinder), referring to the sporangiospore dimensions. The type locality is Jack Cann Reserve, Australia.

== See also ==
- Fungi of Australia
