= Backusella psychrophila =

Scientific classification
- Kingdom: Fungi
- Division: Mucoromycota
- Class: Mucoromycetes
- Order: Mucorales
- Family: Backusellaceae
- Genus: Backusella
- Species: B. psychrophila

Binomial name
- Backusella psychrophila Urquhart & Douch

Species of fungus

Backusella psychrophila is a species of zygote fungus in the order Mucorales. It was described by Andrew S. Urquhart and James K. Douch in 2020. The specific epithet refers to the inability of this species to grow above 30 ˚C. The type locality is Jack Cann Reserve, Australia.

== See also ==
- Fungi of Australia
