= Backusella dispersa =

Scientific classification
- Domain: Eukaryota
- Kingdom: Fungi
- Division: Mucoromycota
- Class: Mucoromycetes
- Order: Mucorales
- Family: Backusellaceae
- Genus: Backusella
- Species: B. dispersa

Binomial name
- Backusella dispersa (Hagem) Urquhart & Douch

Synonyms
- Mucor dispersus Hagem – basionym

Species of fungus

Backusella dispersa is a species of zygote fungus in the order Mucorales. It was originally described in 1910 by Hagem as Mucor dispersus, but in 2020 it was combined by Andrew S. Urquhart and James K. Douch into the genus Backusella, making the new combination B. dispersa.
