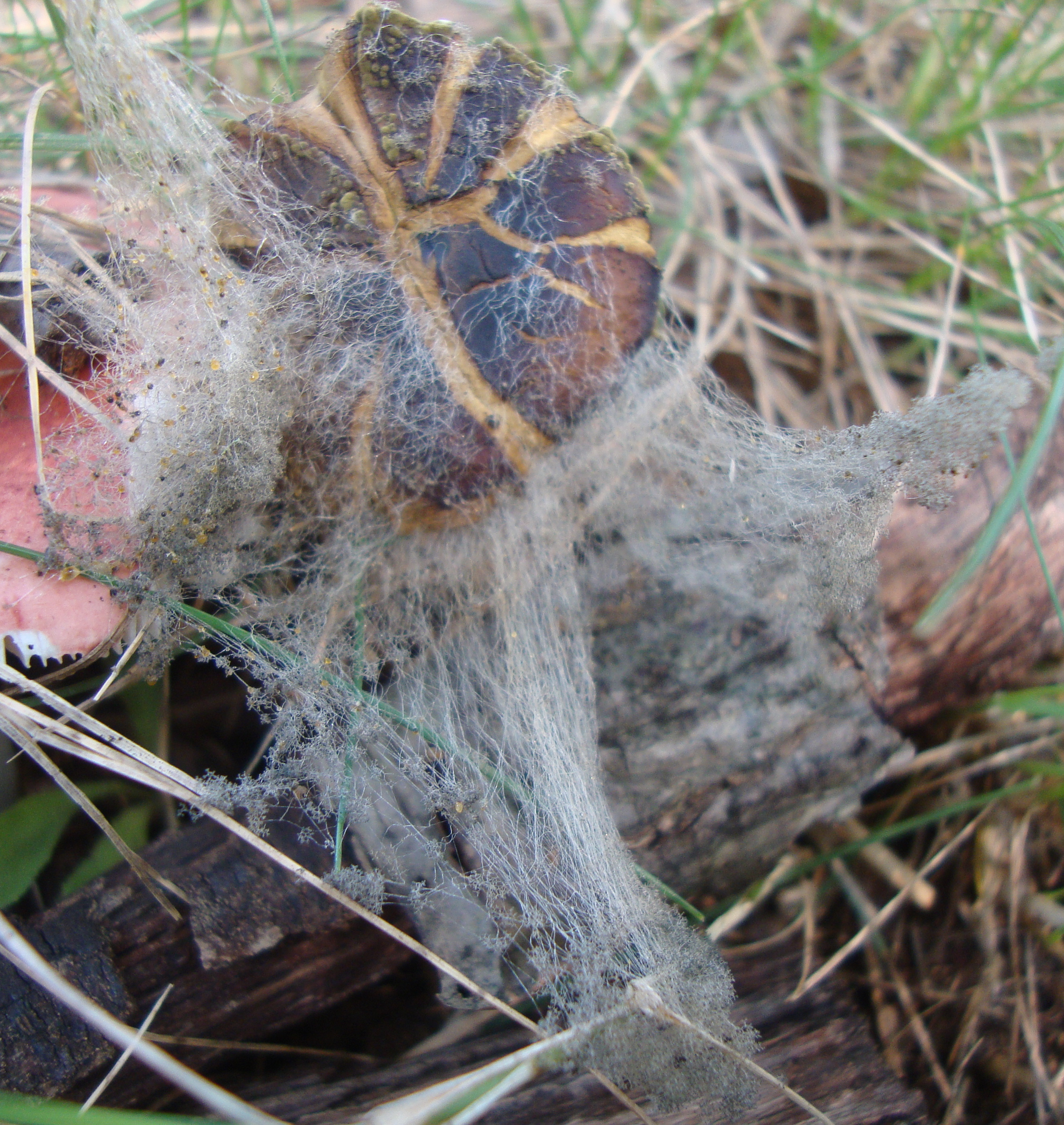
- Hyphae of Syzygites megalocarpus growing on a bolete.

Scientific classification
- Kingdom: Fungi
- Division: Mucoromycota
- Class: Mucoromycetes
- Order: Mucorales
- Family: Mucoraceae
- Genus: Syzygites; Ehrenb.
- Species: S. megalocarpus

Binomial name
- Syzygites megalocarpus Ehrenb.

Synonyms
- Syzygites Ehrenberg (1818); Sporodinia Link (1824); Azygites Moug. & Fr. (1825)

= Syzygites =

Genus of fungi

Syzygites is a monotypic genus in Zygomycota. The sole described species is Syzygites megalocarpus, which was the first fungus for which sex was reported and the main homothallic representative in the research that allowed for the classification of fungi as homothallic or heterothallic. It is also the fungus from which the term "zygospore" was coined.

== Morphology ==
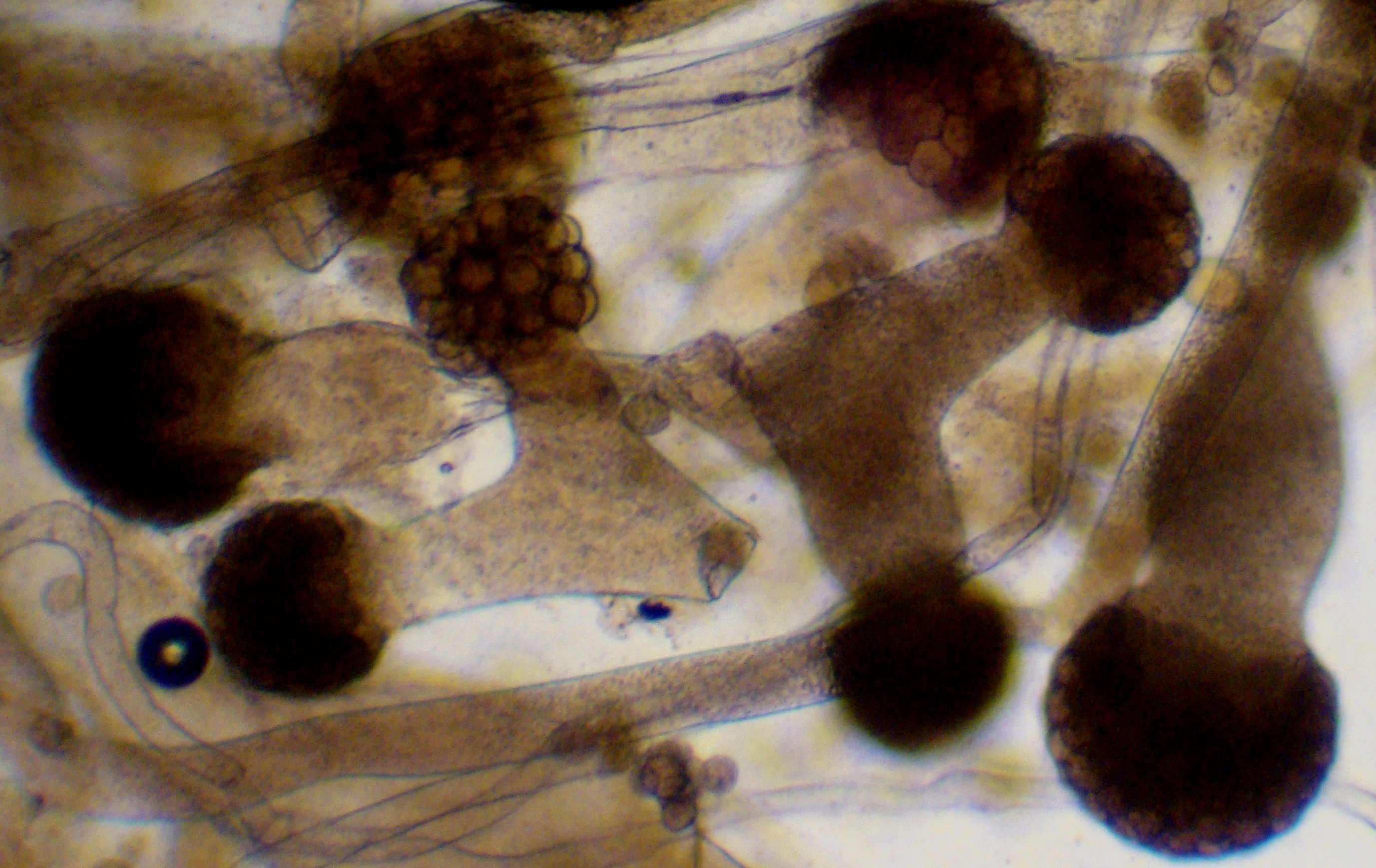
Dichotomously branched sporangiophores of Syzygites megalocarpus viewed at 100x

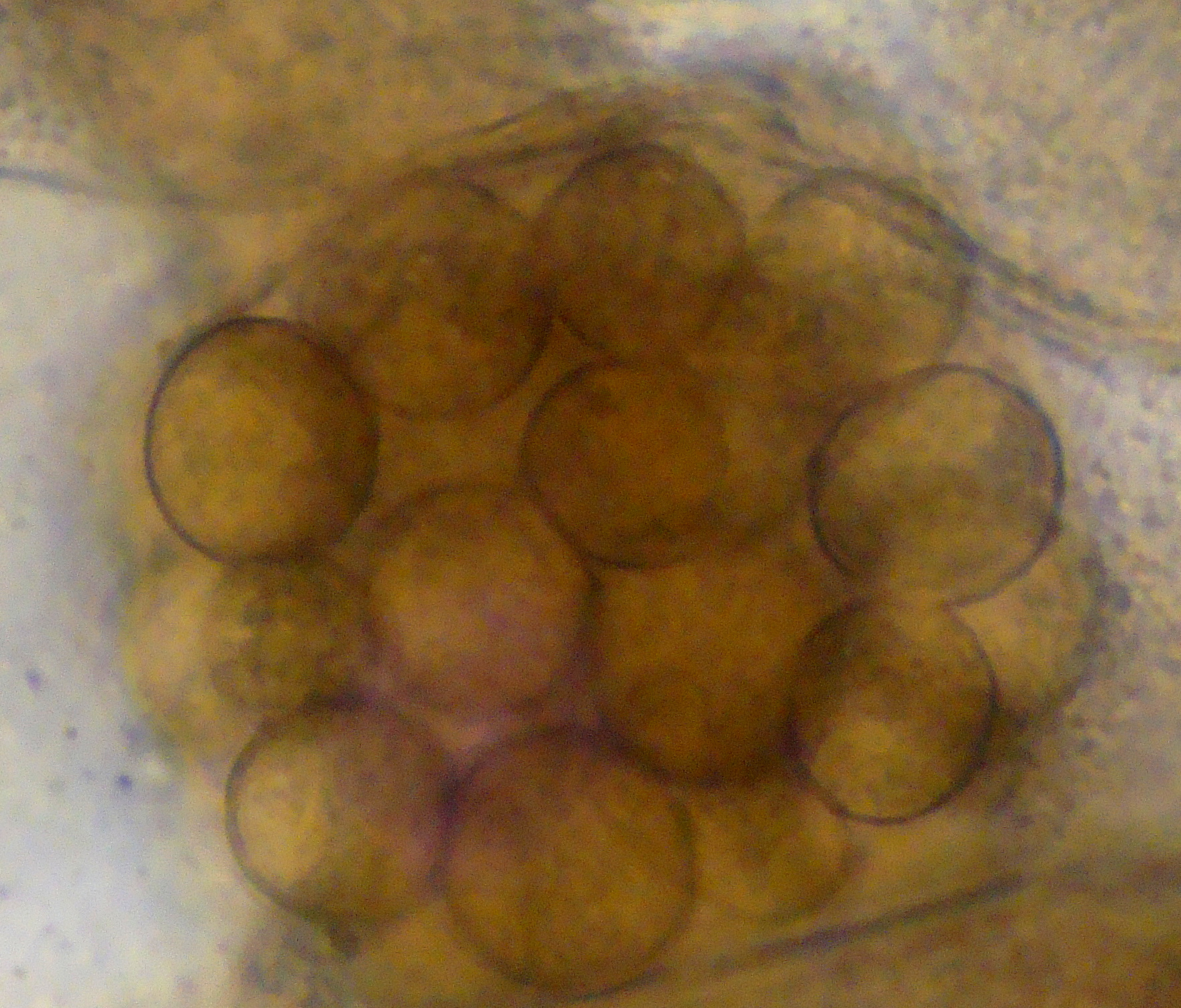
Syzygites megalocarpus sporagiospores at the tip of a sporangiophore viewed at 400x

Syzygites megalocarpus produces phototropic, repeatedly dichotomously branched sporangiophores that terminate in globose, apophysate sporangia. Sporangiospores have a spinose wall, which is rare in Mucorales. Zygospores are pigmented, ornamented, and produced on equally sized suspensors. Due to the presence of carotenoids, the myceliuem can appear yellowish, though mature sporangia darken giving it a brownish appearance.

== Ecology ==
S. megalocarpus is a necrotrophic parasite of mushrooms in temperate regions, though there are reports of it from ascomycetes. It can parasitize at least 98 different species and is itself parasitized by Piptocephalis virginiana. Syzygites megalocarpus is likely a faculative parasite as it can be grown on a variety of media, including bread, in the laboratory. Development of asexual sporangia and zygospores are highly dependent upon environmental conditions. In the laboratory, growth occurs between 5-30 degrees Celsius. Alternating light and dark increases the formation of sporangiophores and continual darkness increases the production of zygospores. Lower temperatures favor zygospore formation and higher temperatures favor sporangiophore production. Media with high quality carbon sources favors formation of zygospores, while media with high nitrogen favors formation of sporangiophores. High humidity increases zygospore formation and low humidity increases sporangiophore formation.

== Sexuality ==
Syzygites megalocarpus is a homothallic fungus, which means each individual contains both mating loci and can therefore self-fertilize to form zygospores. The genes identified in the Mucoromyoctina fungi Phycomyces and Rhizopus are named sexM and sexP for the minus (-) and plus (+) mating types which these gene define. The genes are members of the HMG high-mobility group gene family. As in other members of Mucorales, these genes are flanked by an RNA helicase and glutathione oxidoreductase.

== Taxonomy ==
Ehrenberg described Syzygites megalocarpus in 1818 based on its zygospores and provided illustrations for the fungus in 1829. In 1824, Link described Sporodinia grandis based on the asexual state of Syzygites megalocarpus. In 1832, Fries considered S. megalocarpus and S. grandis to be the same species, though this was not observed until 1855 by Tulasne. Hesseltine summarized the taxonomy of the genus in his 1957 monograph and synonymized 14 species with Syzygites megalocarpus. In a molecular phylogeny, Syzygites megalocarpus is placed sister to Sporodinella umbellata, albeit in a clade with Rhizopus.
