= Umbelopsis =

Scientific classification
- Kingdom: Fungi
- Division: Mucoromycota
- Class: Mucoromycetes
- Order: Mucorales
- Family: Umbelopsidaceae
- Genus: Umbelopsis; Amos & H.L. Barnett

Genus of fungi

Umbelopsis is a genus of fungi, belonging to the family Umbelopsidaceae.

The genus was described in 1966 by Raymond E. Amos and Horace L. Barnett.

Species:

- Umbelopsis isabellina
- Umbelopsis ramanniana
- Umbelopsis vinacea
