= Radiomycetaceae =

Scientific classification
- Kingdom: Fungi
- Division: Mucoromycota
- Class: Mucoromycetes
- Order: Mucorales
- Family: Radiomycetaceae; Hesselt. & J.J. Ellis (1974)

Type genus
- Radiomyces Embree

Genera
- See text

Family of fungi

The Radiomycetaceae are a family of fungi in the order Mucorales. Members of this family have a widespread distribution, but are more commonly found in warm climates.

== Description ==
Species in this family have sporangiola borne on complex ampullae, simple or branched, often stoloniferous sporangiophores, sporangia absent. Their zygospores are smooth, and borne on apposed, appendaged suspensors.
