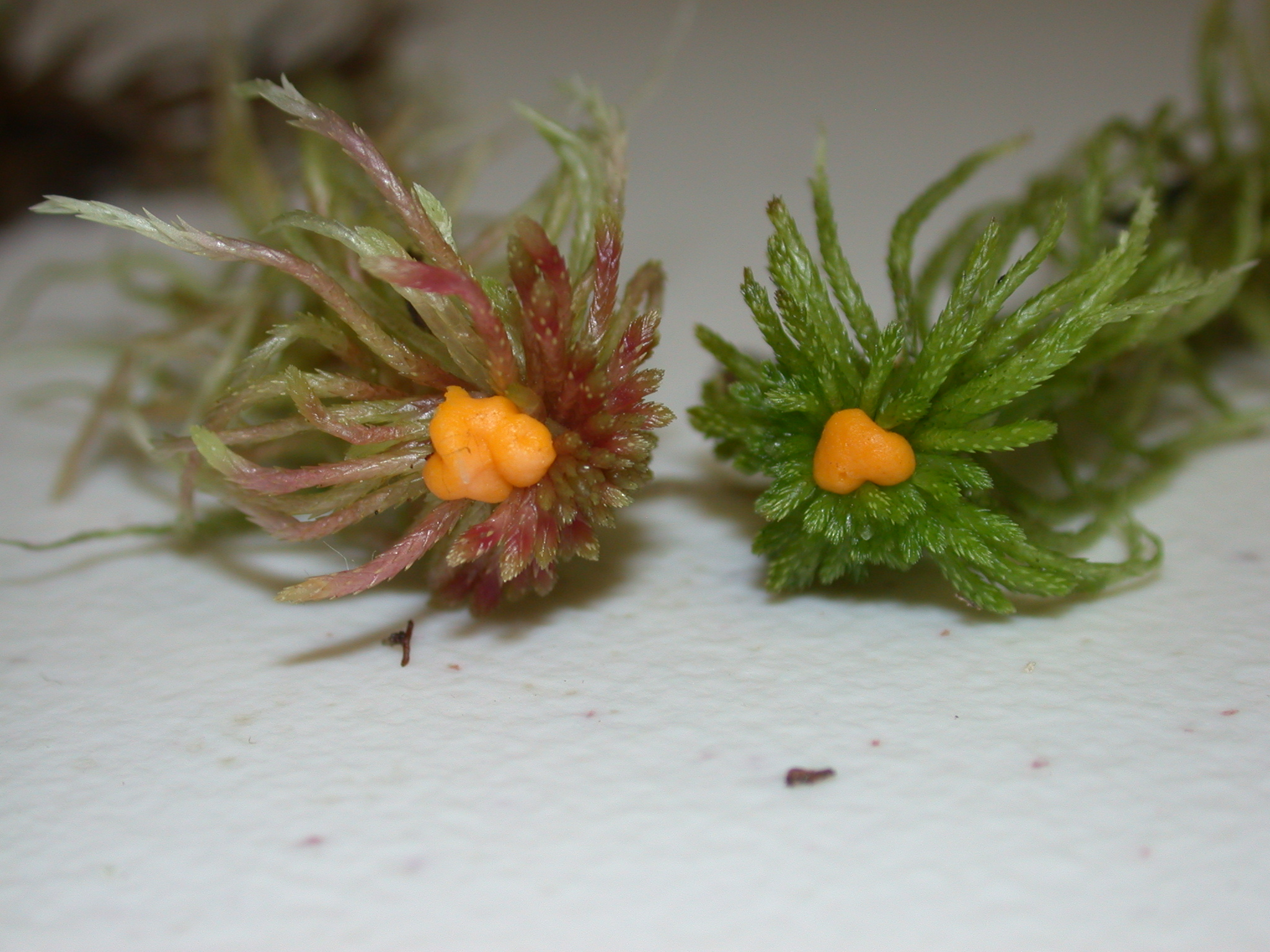
- Endogone pisiformis

Scientific classification
- Kingdom: Fungi
- Division: Mucoromycota
- Subdivision: Mucoromycotina
- Class: Endogonomycetes; Doweld
- Order: Endogonales; Jacz. & P.A.Jacz.

Families
- Endogonaceae; Densosporaceae

= Endogonales =

Order of fungi

Endogonales is an order of fungi within the phylum of Zygomycota, and in class Endogonomycetes.

It contains 2 families; Endogonaceae, with 6 genera and 38 species and Densosporaceae, with one genera and 4 species.

== History ==
The Endogales were originally formed to hold a single family, the Endogonaceae, which comprised 15 species in four genera (Endogone, Peridiospora, Sclerogone, and Youngiomyces). They were transferred to the phylum Glomeromycota to Zygomycetes. Then they were placed in Zygomycotina. They were placed in the subphylum Mucoromycotina in 2017 and genus Youngiomyces was synonymized with genus Endogone. They were then placed in the monotypic class Endogonomycetes.

== Genera ==
Endogonaceae Paol.;

- Endogone Link (26 species)
- Jimgerdemannia Trappe, Desirò, M.E. Sm., Bonito & Bidartondo (3: Jimgerdemannia ambigua Koh. Yamam., Degawa & A. Yamada (2020), Jimgerdemannia flammicorona (Trappe & Gerd.) Trappe, Desirò, M.E. Sm., Bonito & Bonito & Bidart. (2017), Jimgerdemannia lactiflua (Berk. & Broome) Trappe, Desirò, M.E. Sm., Bonito & Bidart. (2017))
- Peridiospora C.G. Wu & Suh J. Lin (2: Peridiospora reticulata C.G. Wu & Suh J. Lin (1997) and Peridiospora tatachia C.G. Wu & Suh J. Lin (1997))
- Sclerogone Warcup (1: Sclerogone eucalypti Warcup (1990))
- Sphaerocreas Sacc. & Ellis (4)
- Vinositunica Koh. Yamam., Degawa & A. Yamada (2: Vinositunica ingens Koh. Yamam., Degawa & A. Yamada (2020) and Vinositunica radiata Koh. Yamam., Degawa & A. Yamada (2020))

Densosporaceae Desirò, M.E. Sm., Bidartondo, Trappe & Bonito;

- Densospora McGee (4 Species: D. nanospora – D. nuda – D. solicarpa – D. tubiformis)

Note; genus Jimwhitea M. Krings & T.N. Taylor was placed in the Endogonaceae family, but holds only fossils reported from the Middle Triassic formations. So is placed in Ascomycota genera Incertae sedis.

== Life cycle ==
The life cycle of the Endogonales is distinguished by their production of small sporocarps containing many zygospores, which are eaten by rodents and distributed by their faeces.

They also produce a fetid odour that attracts mammals and encourages them to eat their fruiting bodies, and so spread their spores.

== Food ==
Like all fungi, they are heterotrophs with some being described as saprobes (with weak evidence).
