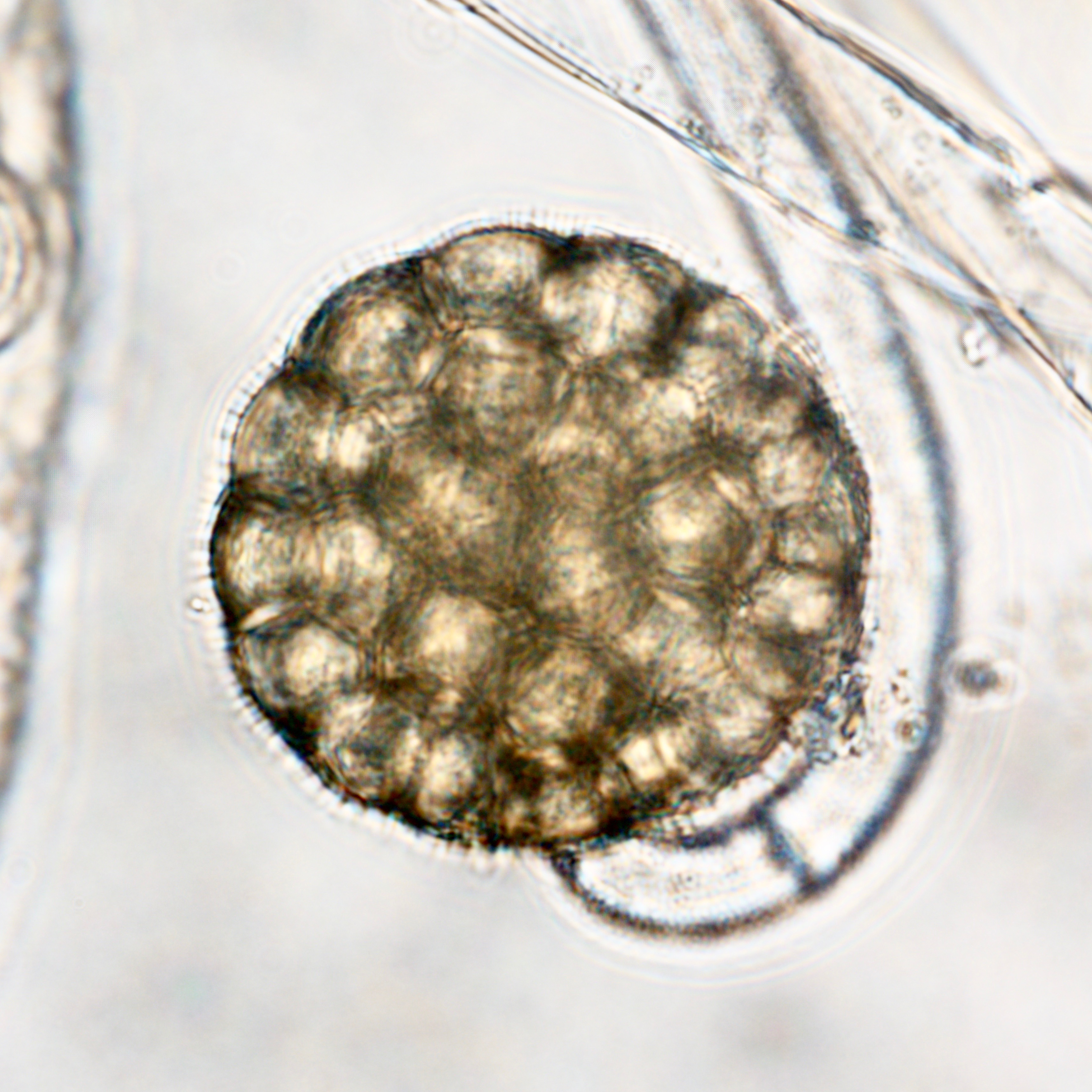
- Sporangium (i.e. a cluster of sporangiospores surrounding a columella (obscured in image by sporangiospores) subtended by a hypha) viewed with bright-field light microscope

Scientific classification
- Kingdom: Fungi
- Division: Mucoromycota
- Class: Mucoromycetes
- Order: Mucorales
- Family: Backusellaceae; K. Voigt & P.M. Kirk
- Genus: Backusella; Hesselt. & J.J. Ellis

Type species
- Backusella circina J.J. Ellis & Hesselt.

Species
- See text

= Backusella =

Genus of fungi

Backusella is the sole genus of zygote fungi in the family Backusellaceae, which is classified in the order Mucorales. Members of this genus have been often isolated from plant litter, from locations around the world.

== Taxonomy ==
C. W. Hesseltine and J. J. Ellis recognised the uniqueness of a new species, B. circina, warranted its classification in a new genus; in 1969 they established Backusella, named in honour of Professor M. P. Backus. Since then, several species previously placed in the archetypal mucoralean genus Mucor were reassessed, found to be close relatives of B. circina, and combined into Backusella as additional Backusella species, while other species were discovered and classified outright as Backusella. K. Voigt & P.M. Kirk established the family Backusellaceae to include Backusella in 2012, as they likewise recognised the uniqueness of the genus and the need to classify it within a distinct family.

=== Accepted species ===
The genus consists of the following 27 accepted species:

- Backusella australiensis Urquhart & Douch
- Backusella azygospora T.R.L. Cordeiro et al.
- Backusella chlamydospora Hyang B. Lee & T.T.T. Nguyen
- Backusella circina J.J. Ellis & Hesselt. – generic type species

Synonym: Mucor pseudolamprosporus H. Nagan. & Hirahara
Synonym: B. johorensis L.S. Loh et al.

- Backusella constricta D.X. Lima et al.
- Backusella dispersa (Hagem) Urquhart & Douch

Basionym: M. dispersus Hagem

- Backusella gigacellularis J.I. Souza et al.
- Backusella granulispora L.S. Loh & Kuthub.
- Backusella indica (Baijal & B.S. Mehrotra) Walther & de Hoog

Basionym: M. recurvus var. indicus [as 'indica' ] Baijal & B.S. Mehrotra

- Backusella koreana Hyang B. Lee et al.
- Backusella lamprospora (Lendn.) Benny & R.K. Benj. (1975)

Basionym: M. lamprosporus Lendn.
Synonym: B. circina var. lamprospora (Lendn.) R.Y. Zheng

- Backusella liffmaniae Urquhart & Douch
- Backusella locustae Hyang B. Lee et al.
- Backusella luteola Urquhart & Douch
- Backusella macrospora Urquhart & Douch
- Backusella mclennaniae Urquhart & Douch
- Backusella morwellensis Urquhart & Douch
- Backusella oblongielliptica (H. Nagan. et al. ex Pidopl. & Milko) Walther & de Hoog

Basionym: M. oblongiellipticus H. Nagan. et al. ex Pidopl. & Milko

- Backusella oblongispora (Naumov) Walther & de Hoog

Basionym: M. oblongisporus Naumov

- Backusella parvicylindrica Urquhart & Douch
- Backusella psychrophila Urquhart & Douch
- Backusella recurva (E.E. Butler) Walther & de Hoog

Basionym: M. recurvus E.E. Butler
Synonym: M. recurvus var. aspinosus L.S. Loh
Synonym: M. aromaticus Povah

- Backusella tarrabulga Urquhart & Douch
- Backusella thermophila Hyang B. Lee et al.
- Backusella tuberculispora (Schipper 1978) G. Walther & de Hoog

Basionym: M. tuberculisporus Schipper 1978
Synonym: M. heterosporus sensu Baijal & Mehrotra; fide Schipper

- Backusella variabilis (A.K. Sarbhoy) G. Walther & de Hoog

Basionym: M. variabilis A.K. Sarbhoy
Synonym: M. grandis Schipper & Samson
Synonym: B. grandis (Schipper & Samson) G. Walther & de Hoog

- Backusella westeae Urquhart & Douch

=== Former species ===
The following species was at one point considered by some authorities to be in the genus Backusella, although this is no longer so:

- Mucor ctenidius (Durrell & M. Fleming) Pidopl. & Milko ex Benny & R.K. Benj.

Basionym: Thamnidium ctenidium Durrell & M. Fleming
Synonym: B. ctenidia (Durrell & M. Fleming) Pidopl. & Milko ex Benny & R.K. Benj.
