= Umbelopsidaceae =

Scientific classification
- Kingdom: Fungi
- Division: Mucoromycota
- Class: Mucoromycetes
- Order: Mucorales
- Family: Umbelopsidaceae; W. Gams & W. Mey. (2003)

Type genus
- Umbelopsis Amos & H.L. Barnett (1966)

Family of fungi

The Umbelopsidaceae are a family of fungi in the order Mucorales. Members of this family (currently in the single genus Umbelopsis) have a widespread distribution.
