= Gretna Margaret Weste =

- Born: 5 September 1917; Dumfries, Scotland
- Died: 30 August 2006 (aged 88)
- Education: Doctor of Philosophy (PhD), Doctor of Science (DSc)
- Alma mater: University of Melbourne
- Awards: Member of the Order of Australia (AM) (1989), Australasian Plant Pathology Society Medal (1995)
- Scientific career
- Fields: Botany, Plant Pathology, mycology
- Workplaces: University of Melbourne

Gretna Margaret Weste AM (5 September 1917 – 30 August 2006) was a leading scientist noted for her work in plant pathology and mycology, specifically with Phytophthora cinnamomi.

== Biography ==
Gretna Margaret Weste (née Parkin) was born in Dumfriesshire, Scotland in 1917 to Australian parents, Grace and Arthur Parkin. Her father was a volunteer chemist in the local munitions factory, H.M. Factory Gretna, which produced Cordite RDB, colloquially known as the "Devil's Porridge". The family lived at 24 the Ridge, Eastriggs during World War One and a brother Tom was also born during this time.

The family returned to Australia when Gretna was two years old, and she grew up in Surrey Hills, an outer-suburb of Melbourne.

Her schooling was completed through scholarships, first at the Methodist Ladies' College, Melbourne where she gained final-year honors at the botany exhibition, and won a government scholarship to the University of Melbourne. At the University of Melbourne, she obtained a Bachelor of Science (BSc) in 1938 and Master of Science (MSc) in 1939 on wood anatomy. She was awarded a PhD in 1969 and a University of Melbourne Doctor of Science (DSc) in 1984 for her published papers. In 1989 she was awarded a Member in the Order of Australia (AM) for "service to science, particularly in the field of botany.

Weste was a foundation member of the Australian Conservation Foundation and an active member of numerous community natural history associations, including the Field Naturalists Club of Victoria, the Victorian National Parks Association, the Environmental Studies Association of Victoria, the Friends of Warrandyte State Park and the 100 Acres Reserve in Park Orchards, the Montrose Environment Group, the Ringwood Field Naturalists Club, and the Maroondah branch of the Society for Growing Australian Plants (now the Australian Native Plants Society).

== Research ==
Weste was noted for her many contributions to the fields of plant pathology and mycology. For her Masters of Science research, she studied wood anatomy—which proved useful in preserving the huge quantities of dead standing Mountain Ash timber which resulted as a consequence of the Black Friday bushfires of 1939. Her Doctor of Philosophy degree was in agricultural plant pathology, on the root-rotting pathogen of wheat Gaeumannomyces graminis. After this she turned her research attention to Phytophthora cinnamomi, a root pathogen of Australian indigenous plants.

The standard author abbreviation Weste is used to indicate this person as the author when citing a botanical name.

== Personal life ==
Gretna Parkin married Geoffe Weste, a forester, in December 1941 and they had three children.

== See also ==
- Backusella westeae – named in honour of Weste
