= Ethel Irene McLennan =

Australian botanist and educator (1891–1983)

- Born: 15 March 1891; Williamstown Australia
- Died: 12 June 1983 (aged 92); Melbourne Australia
- Education: University of Melbourne
- Scientific career
- Fields: Mycology; Botany
- Workplaces: University of Melbourne; Rothamsted Agricultural Experimental Station; Imperial College of Science and Technology
- Author abbrev. (botany): McLennan

Ethel Irene McLennan (15 March 1891 – 12 June 1983) was an Australian botanist, mycologist and educator.

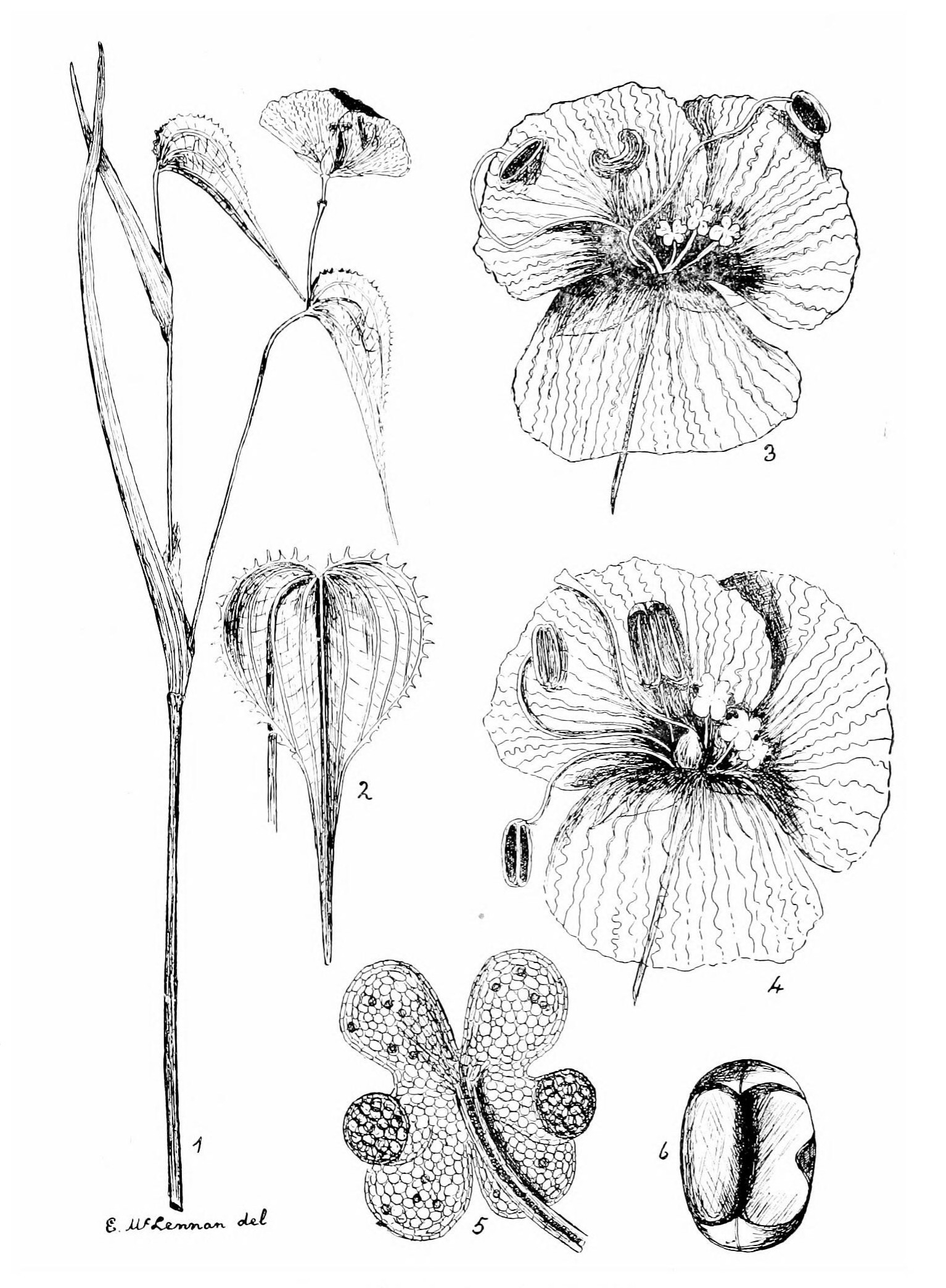
McLennan's 1917 botanical illustration of Commelina ciliata

== Personal life and early career ==
The daughter of George McLennan and Eleanor Tucker, she was born in Williamstown, Victoria and was educated at the Tintern Church of England Girls' Grammar School in Hawthorn. In 1914, she received a BSc from the University of Melbourne. From 1915 to 1931, she was a demonstrator and botany lecturer at the university. Her main areas of interest were mycology and plant-fungal relationships. However, she was also one of the illustrators of The Flora of the Northern Territories (1917).

In 1921, McLennan completed a DSc at the university. She received an International Federation of University Women fellowship in 1925 which allowed her to pursue research at the Rothamsted Agricultural Experimental Station and the Imperial College of Science and Technology in London. In 1927, she was awarded the David Syme Research Prize by the University of Melbourne for her work on Lolium, the second woman to win the prize.

McLennan died in Melbourne at the age of 92.

== Academic career ==
From 1931 to 1955, she was an associate professor of botany at the University of Melbourne; her research areas particularly included fungal symbioses and endophytes and also the fungal flora of soils. McLennan was acting head of the Biology department from 1937 to 1938. In collaboration with colleagues during the Second World War, she contributed to improvements to the utility of optical instruments in tropical regions, where fungi were prone to cause defects. She retired in 1955; from 1956 to 1972, she was part-time keeper of the university herbarium.

In 1929, McLennan was chair of the Australian Pan-Pacific Women's Committee and, in 1934, she was president of the Australian Federation of University Women.

== Notable publications ==
The standard author abbreviation McLennan is used to indicate this person as the author when citing a botanical name.

She was author or co-author of at least 17 publications including:

- Derrick, E and McLennan, E. I. (1963) Fungus spores found in the air in Melbourne (Victoria) Australia. Acta Allergologica European Journal of Allergy and Clinical Immunology 18 26 - 43
- EI McLennan (1959) Gastrodia sesamoides R. Br. and its endophyte Australian Journal of Botany 7 225 - 229
- McLennan, E. I. and Ducker, S. C. (1954) The ecology of the soil fungi of an Australian heathland. Australian Journal of Botany 2 220 - 245
- Preston, A. and McLennan, E. I. (1948) The uses of dyes in culture media for distinguishing brown and white wood-rotting fungi. Annals of Botany 12 53 - 64
- Turner, J. S., McLennan, E. I., Rogers, J. S. and Matthaei, E. (1946) Tropic-Proofing of Optical Instruments by a Fungicide. Nature 158 469-472
- McLennan, E. I. (1935) Non-Symbiotic Development of Seedlings of Epacris impressa Labill. New Phytologist 34 55 - 63
- McLennan, E. I. (1928) The growth of fungi in soil. Annals of Applied Biology 15 95-109
- McLennan, E. I. (1926) The endophytic fungus of Lolium II. The mycorrhiza on the roots of Lolium temulentum, L, with a discussion on the physiological relationships of the organism concerned. Annals of Botany 40 43-68

== See also ==
- Backusella mclennaniae – named in honour of McLennan
