= Gametangium =

Multicellular sex organs in plant life

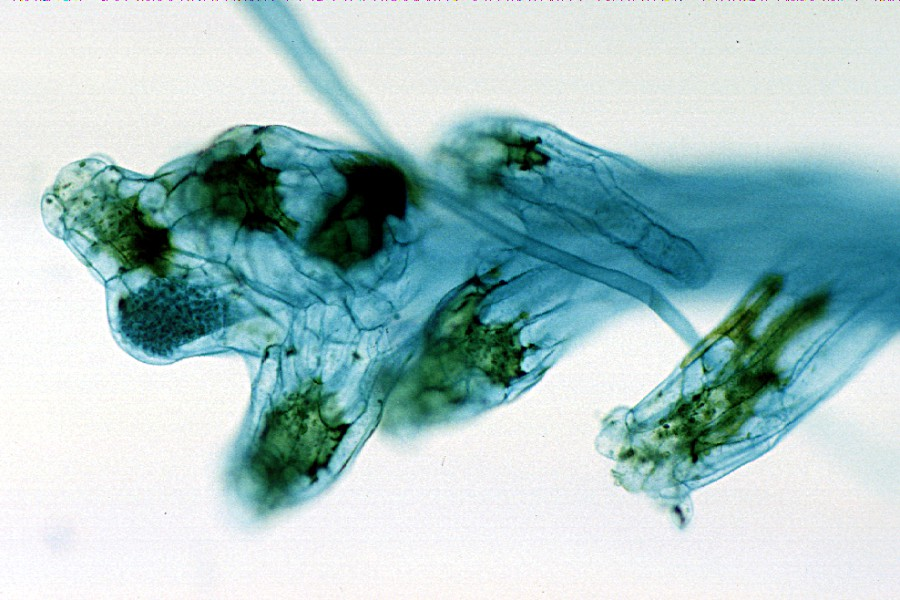
Light micrograph of a whole-mount slide of gametangia of Equisetum

A gametangium (pl.: gametangia) is a sex organ or cell in which gametes are produced that is found in many multicellular protists, algae, fungi, and the gametophytes of plants. In contrast to gametogenesis in animals, a gametangium is a haploid structure and formation of gametes does not involve meiosis.

== Types of gametangia ==
Depending on the type of gamete produced in a gametangium, several types can be distinguished.

=== Female ===
Female gametangia are most commonly called archegonia. They produce egg cells and are the sites for fertilization. Archegonia are common in algae and primitive plants as well as gymnosperms. In flowering plants, they are replaced by the embryo sac inside the ovule.

=== Male ===
The male gametangia are most commonly called antheridia. They produce sperm cells that they release for fertilization. Antheridia producing non-motile sperm (spermatia) are called spermatangia. Some antheridia do not release their sperm. For example, the oomycete antheridium is a syncytium with many sperm nuclei and fertilization occurs via fertilization tubes growing from the antheridium and making contact with the egg cells. Antheridia are common in the gametophytes in "lower" plants such as bryophytes, ferns, cycads and ginkgo. In "higher" plants such as conifers and flowering plants, they are replaced by pollen grains.

=== Isogamous ===
In isogamy, the gametes look alike and cannot be classified into "male" or "female." For example, in zygomycetes, two gametangia (single multinucleate cells at the end of hyphae) form good contact with each other and fuse into a zygosporangium. Inside the zygosporangium, the nuclei from each of the original two gametangia pair up.

== See also ==
- Zoosporangium, a gametangium that produces motile isogamous gametes, called zoospores
