= Tarra-Bulga National Park =

National park in Australia

- IUCN category II (national park)
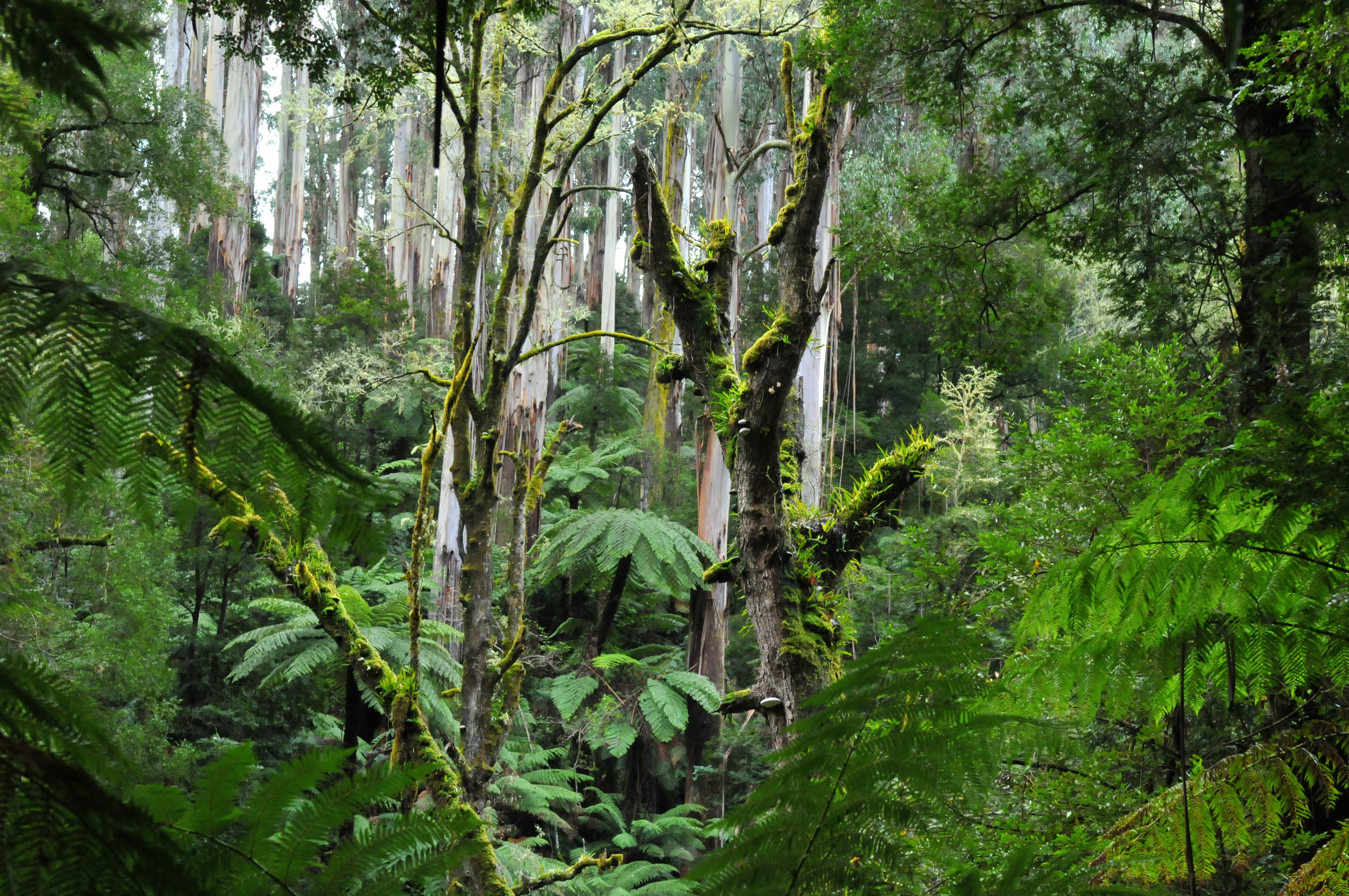
- Forest near Cyathea Falls, in the national park

- Location within Victoria
- Location: Victoria
- Nearest city: Yarram
- Coordinates: 38°26′30″S 146°34′48″E
- Area: 15.22 km^{2} (5.88 sq mi)
- Established: 17 June 1986
- Visitors: 80,000 (in 1995)
- Governing body: Parks Victoria; Gunaikurnai people
- Website: Official website

The Tarra-Bulga National Park is a small national park located in the South Gippsland region of eastern Victoria, Australia approximately 240 kilometres (150 mi) south east of Melbourne. The park is located 33 kilometres (21 mi) south of Traralgon on the Traralgon-Balook Road and 24 kilometres (15 mi) north of Yarram.

The 1,522-hectare (3,760-acre) national park is situated in the eastern part of the Strzelecki Ranges. The national park is home to one of the last undisturbed remnants of the native eucalypt temperate rainforest that once covered the Strzelecki Ranges until the last decades of the nineteenth century. The pocket of undisturbed mountain ash forest, fern gully communities and associated native myrtle beech stands within the park are of considerable biogeographical significance.

== History ==
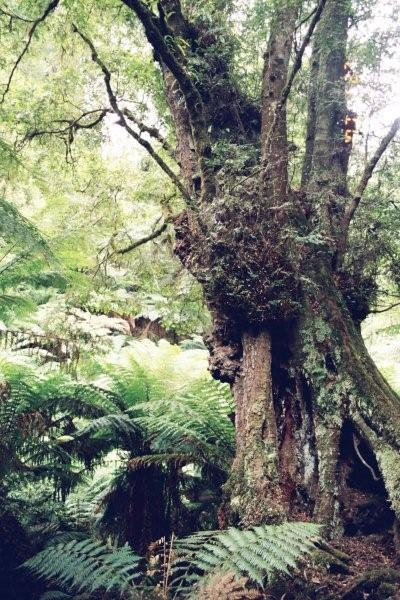
Tarra Bulga forest

Alberton Shire Council asked the Victorian Government to set aside forest with fern gullies near Balook as a public park in 1903. The first area to be reserved was 20 hectares (49 acres) in 1904 and named Bulga National Park after the Gunai language word bulga, meaning mountain.

In 1906 Tarra Valley National Park was designated nearby, temporarily comprising 303 hectares (750 acres), then later reduced to 40 hectares (99 acres). Tarra Valley is named after Indigenous Burra Burra man Charley Tarra, who guided Count Paweł Strzelecki on his expedition through this area of Gippsland in 1840.

The two parks were merged to form Tarra-Bulga National Park following recommendations by the Land Conservation Council. The parks were joined through a land exchange with APM Forests Pty Ltd. An enlarged and renamed park of 1,230 hectares (3,000 acres) was declared on 17 June 1986. By 1990 Tarra-Bulga National Park covered 1,625 hectares (4,020 acres), increasing to 2,015 hectares (4,980 acres) in 2005.

=== Kara Healey ===
New Zealander-Australian woman Kara Moana Healey was a park ranger in the Tarra Valley from 1952 to 1963, who was celebrated for her contribution to the park with a ceremony and plaque as part of the centenary celebration of the park in 2007.

A field collector, conservationist, preservationist and naturalist, Healey became the first female National Park Ranger in Victoria after responding to a call from the CSIRO to collect specimens for the National Herbarium of Victoria.

Over ten years, Healey collected specimens within the Tarra Valley, often visiting dangerous areas alone, where some of the unspoilt specimens were located and the nests of the lyrebird could be found. By 1961 Healey had collected over 160 specimens of fungi and including two new types that were named after her. The first was Poria healeyi, a fungus causing yellow straw rot in mountain ash, and the second was Lambertella healeyi, a fungus growing on another fungus.

Healey collected animal and insect specimens using dead animals that she found. In total, she collected over 500 specimens, including 80 species of moss. Subsequently, Tarra Valley was the most thoroughly studied and recorded area in Australia at the time.

== Features ==
There are many walking tracks that emanate from the picnic areas. The Tarra Valley Rainforest Walk is a short and easy walk taking in Cyathea Falls, and the Fern Gully Nature Walk, passes over Corrigan's Suspension Bridge, which stretches through the rainforest canopy with views of the fern gully below. The three- to four-day 100-kilometre (62 mi) Grand Strzelecki Track connects the park with the adjacent Morwell National Park.

The park is a popular tourist attraction with a visitor centre, picnic areas with tables, fireplaces shelters and toilets. The visitors centre is open on weekends and school and public holidays. It is staffed by members of the Friends of Tarra-Bulga National Park who also undertake restoration and monitoring activities.

Since 22 October 2010, the national park has been jointly managed by Parks Victoria in partnership with the Gunaikurnai people, who are the traditional owners of the land.

== Flora and fauna ==
The deeply incised river valleys of the park are dominated by wet sclerophyll tall open forest of mountain ash (Eucalyptus regnans), with an understory of blackwood (Acacia melanoxylon), hazel pomaderris (Pomaderris aspera) and tree ferns (Dicksonia antarctica and Cyathea australis). Pockets of the park feature cool temperate rainforest, including myrtle beech (Nothofagus cunninghamii). The ridges are dominated by open forest and low open forest of stringybark eucalypts and gums. The park is also noted for its diversity of fungi species, which are prominent in autumn.

The rainforest is a haven for plants and wildlife, and is particularly well known for its giant mountain ash trees and lush fern gullies. There are a wide variety of birds residing in the park including the pilotbird, yellow tailed black cockatoo, eastern whipbird, and currawongs. In the evening possums, owls and bats emerge to feed. Lyrebirds, wombats, swamp wallabies, gliders and platypuses can also be found within the park.

== See also ==
- Backusella tarrabulga – named for Tarra-Bulga National Park
- Errinundra National Park
- Great Otway National Park
- Melba Gully State Park
- Protected areas of Victoria
- List of national parks of Australia
