= Morwell National Park =

National park in Victoria, Australia

- IUCN category III (natural monument or feature)
- Location within Australia
- Location: Victoria
- Nearest city: Churchill
- Coordinates: 38°21′59″S 146°23′26″E
- Area: 5.65 km^{2} (2.18 sq mi)
- Established: 26 November 1966
- Governing body: Parks Victoria
- Website: Official website

The Morwell National Park is a national park located in the western Gippsland region of Victoria, Australia. The 565-hectare (1,400-acre) national park is situated approximately 164 kilometres (102 mi) east of Melbourne via the Princes Highway and 16 kilometres (9.9 mi) south of Morwell in the Strzelecki Ranges. The park preserves a remnant of previously widespread wet sclerophyll forests and some rainforest remnants restricted to deep creek gullies. 320 plant species have been recorded for this park, including five rare or threatened species and 44 orchid species. 179 native fauna species have been recorded, including 27 mammals, 127 birds, 19 reptiles and 6 amphibians.

Weeds and pest animals represent a threat to the park, particularly because of its small size.

The park was created by a 1967 Act of Parliament, in response to lobbying from members of the Latrobe Valley Field Naturalists Club. Club members had recognised the ecological significance of the land in the early 1950s after finding butterfly orchid (Sarcochilus australis), as well as other notable species of flora and fauna.

The national park is protected by the local conservation society, the Friends of Morwell National Park.

== See also ==
- Backusella morwellensis – named after Morwell National Park
- Protected areas of Victoria
- List of national parks of Australia
