= Zygospore =

Reproductive stage

A zygospore is a diploid reproductive stage in the life cycle of many fungi and protists. Zygospores are created by the nuclear fusion of haploid cells. In fungi, zygospores are formed in zygosporangia after the fusion of specialized budding structures, from mycelia of the same (in homothallic fungi) or different mating types (in heterothallic fungi), and may be chlamydospores. In many eukaryotic algae, including many species of the Chlorophyta, zygospores are formed by the fusion of unicellular gametes of different mating types.

A zygospore remains dormant while it waits for environmental cues, such as light, moisture, heat, or chemicals secreted by plants. When the environment is favorable, the zygospore germinates, meiosis occurs, and haploid vegetative cells are released.

In fungi, a sporangium is produced at the end of a sporangiophore that sheds spores. A fungus that forms zygospores is called a zygomycete, indicating that the class is characterized by this evolutionary development.
