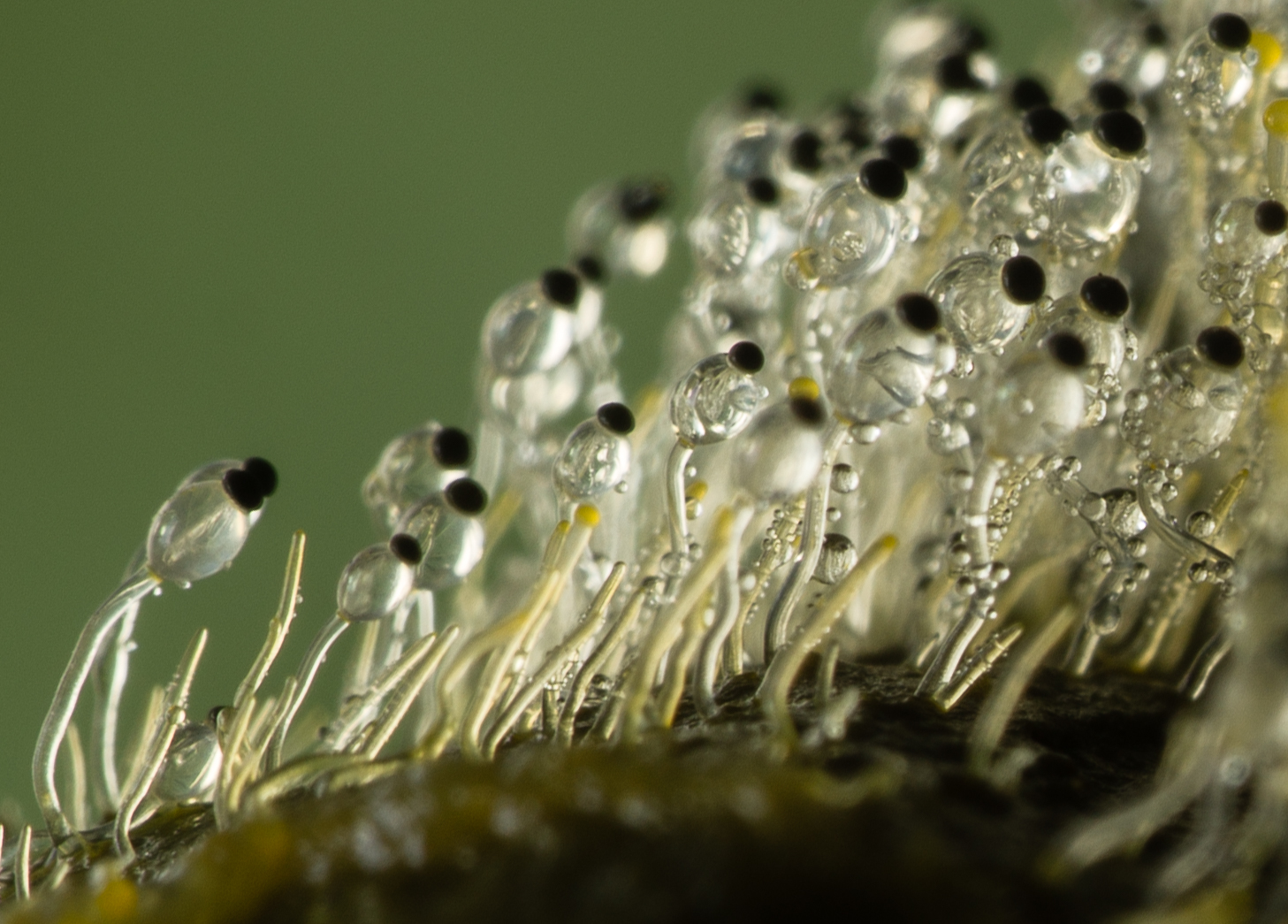
- Pilobolus crystallinus sporangia

Scientific classification
- Kingdom: Fungi
- Division: Mucoromycota
- Class: Mucoromycetes
- Order: Mucorales

Families
- See text

= Mucorales =

Order of fungi

The Mucorales is the largest and best-studied order of zygomycete fungi. Members of this order are sometimes called pin molds. The term mucormycosis is now preferred for infections caused by molds belonging to the order Mucorales.

== Systematics ==
The order includes: 11 families, 56 genera, and approximately 300 species. Mucoralean classification has traditionally been based on morphological, developmental, and ecological characteristics. Recently, molecular data has revealed that some aspects of traditional classification are quite artificial. For example, the Mucoraceae is believed to be polyphyletic, as are the Thamnidiaceae, Chaetocladiaceae and Radiomycetaceae. Some of the genera, (including Mucor, Absidia and Backusella) appear to be polyphyletic. Today, the traditional system is still largely in use, as further studies are needed to reconcile morphological and molecular concepts of families and genera.

=== Families ===
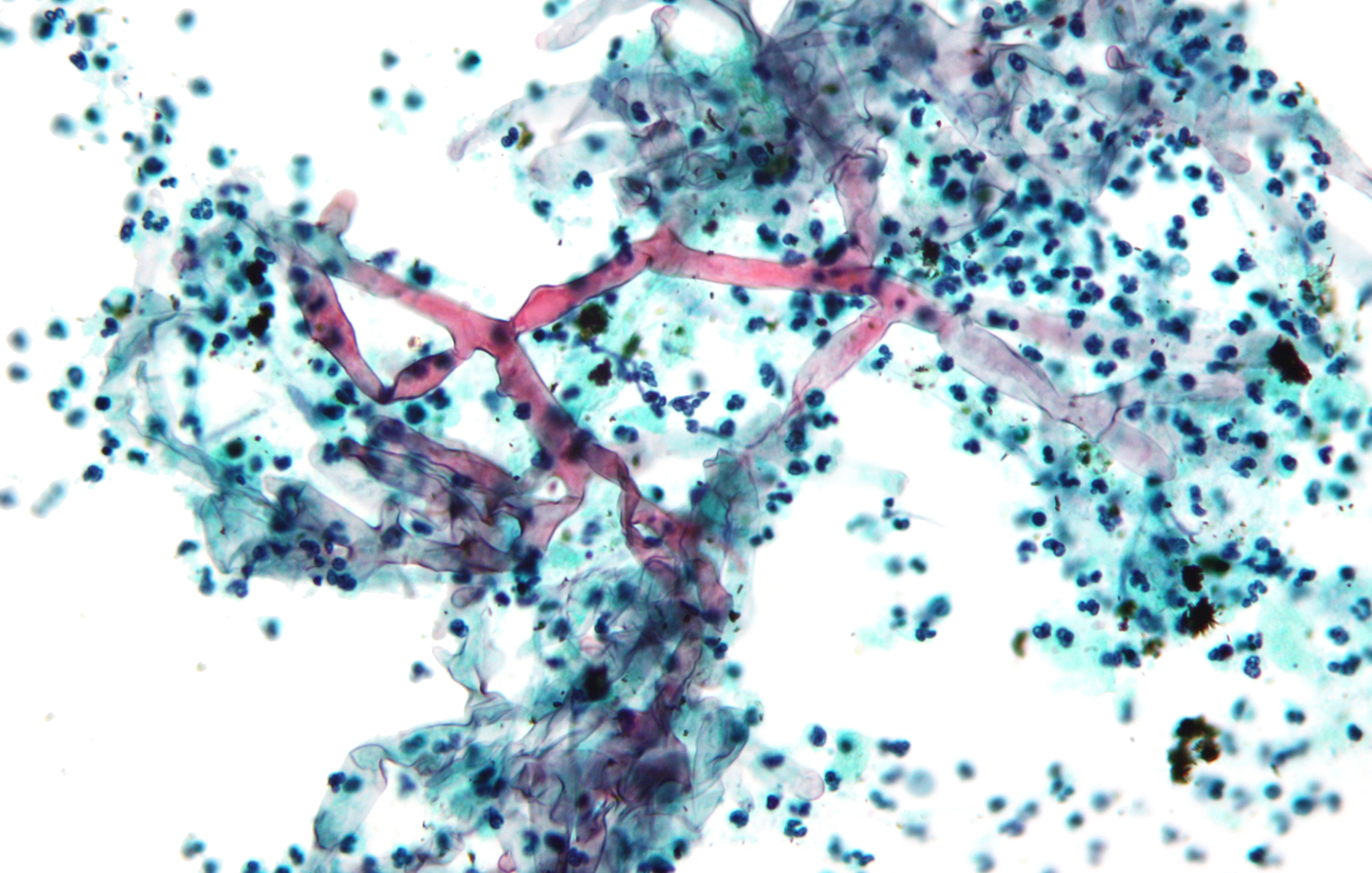
Micrograph of a mucoralean fungus, showing characteristic variation in thickness

The order consists of the following families:

- Backusellaceae
- Choanephoraceae
- Cunninghamellaceae
- Mucoraceae
- Mycotyphaceae
- Phycomycetaceae
- Pilobolaceae
- Radiomycetaceae
- Saksenaeaceae
- Syncephalastraceae
- Umbelopsidaceae

== Description ==
Mucoralean fungi are typically fast-growing, and their wide hyphae (long, filamentous structures) lack septa (multi-perforate septa are present only in sporangiophores and gametangia). The hyphae grow mostly within the substrate. Sporangiophores are upright (simple or ramified) hyphae, that support sac-like sporangia filled with asexual sporangiospores. Other structures include merospores, oidia, and sporangiola.

Many are known by the damage they do to stored food such as bread. Others can cause mucormycosis, generally in immunosuppressed patients, or patients already infected with other diseases.

== Life cycle ==
The sporangiospores are asexual mitospores (formed via mitosis), produced inside sporangia (thousands of spores) or sporangioles (single or few spores). They are released when mature by the disintegration of the sporangium wall, or as a whole sporangiole that separates from the sporangiophore.

The sporangiospores germinate to form the haploid hyphae of a new mycelium. Asexual reproduction often occurs continuously.

In heterothallic species, sexual reproduction occurs when opposite mating types (designated + and -) come into close proximity, inducing the formation of specialized hyphae called gametangia. The gametangia grow toward each other, then fuse, forming a diploid zygote at the point of fusion. The zygote develops a resistant cell wall, forming a single-celled zygospore, the characteristic that gives its name to this group of fungi. Meiosis occurs within the zygospore (see article Phycomyces). Upon germination, a new haploid mycelium or sporangium is formed. Some species are homothallic.

The original report of sex in fungi, occurred two centuries ago, based on observations of the fungus Syzygites megalocarpus (Mucoromycotina) (reviewed by Idnurm). This species, was subsequently used in 1904, to represent self-fertile species when the concept of two major mating strategies were developed for the fungi. These strategies are homothallism for self-fertile fungi and heterothallism for self-incompatible, outcrossing fungi.

== Ecology ==
Most Mucoralean species are saprotrophic, and grow on organic substrates (such as fruit, soil, and dung). Some species are parasites or pathogens of animals, plants and fungi. A few species cause human and animal disease.
