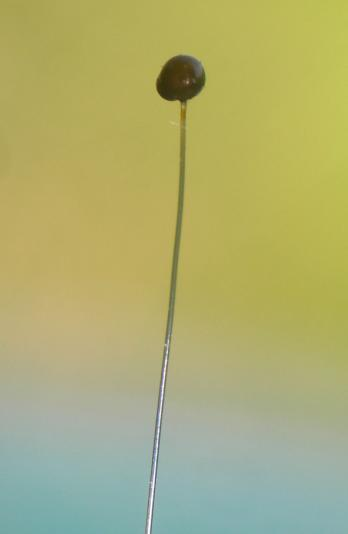
- Sporangium of a Phycomyces sp.

Scientific classification
- Kingdom: Fungi
- Division: Zygomycota; C. Moreau 1954 (informal)
- Class: Zygomycetes; Winter 1881

Orders
- Mucoromycotina: Endogonales; Mucorales; Mortierellales; Kickxellomycotina: Asellariales; Kickxellales; Dimargaritales; Harpellales; Entomophthoromycotina: Entomophthorales; Zoopagomycotina: Zoopagales

= Zygomycota =

Division or phylum of the kingdom Fungi

Zygomycota, or zygote fungi, is a former division or phylum of the kingdom Fungi. The members are now part of two phyla: the Mucoromycota and Zoopagomycota. Approximately 1060 species are known. They are mostly terrestrial in habitat, living in soil or on decaying plant or animal material. Some are parasites of plants, insects, and small animals, while others form symbiotic relationships with plants. Zygomycete hyphae may be coenocytic, forming septa only where gametes are formed or to wall off dead hyphae. Zygomycota is no longer recognised as it was not believed to be truly monophyletic.

== Etymology ==
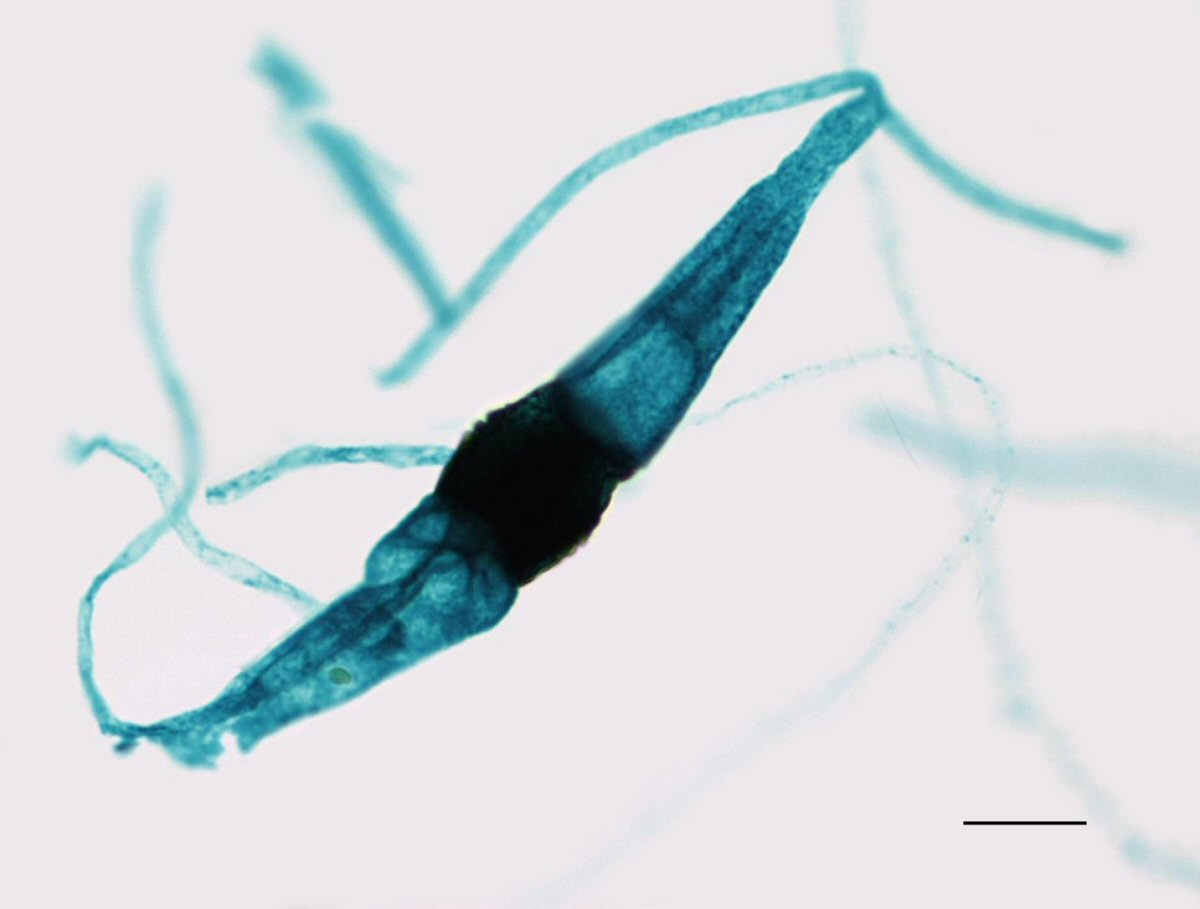
An immature zygosporangium of the Rhizopus fungus forming from two fused gametangia, showing a "yoke" shape.

The name Zygomycota refers to the zygosporangia characteristically formed by the members of this clade, in which resistant spherical spores are formed during sexual reproduction. Zygos is Greek for "joining" or "a yoke", referring to the fusion of two hyphal strands which produces these spores, and -mycota is a suffix referring to a division of fungi.

== Spores ==
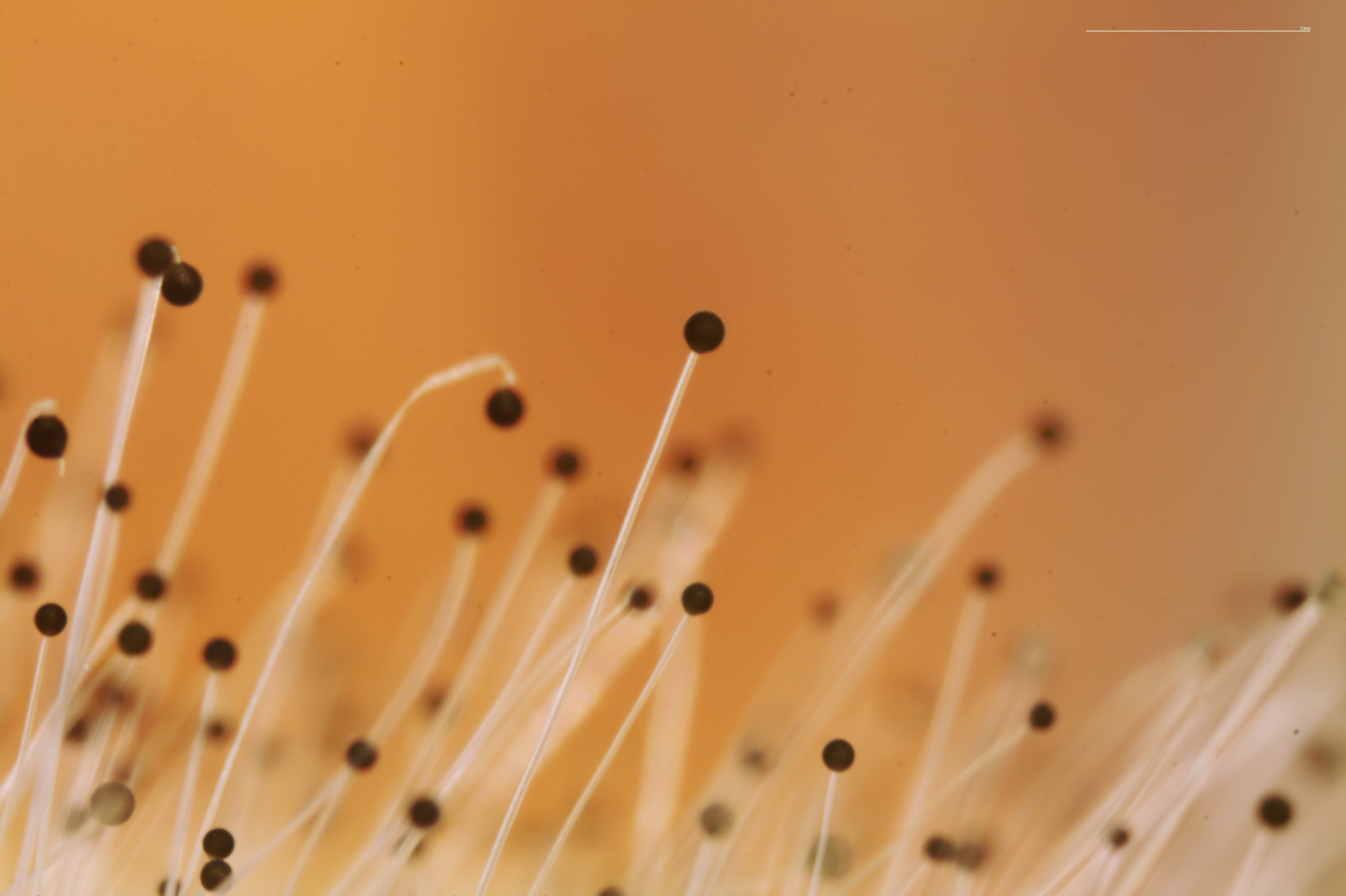
Detail of sporangia of a Mucorales fungi species growing on a peach.

The term "spore" is used to describe a structure related to propagation and dispersal. Zygomycete spores can be formed through both sexual and asexual means. Before germination the spore is in a dormant state. During this period, the metabolic rate is very low and it may last from a few hours to many years. There are two types of dormancy. The exogenous dormancy is controlled by environmental factors such as temperature or nutrient availability. The endogenous or constitutive dormancy depends on characteristics of the spore itself; for example, metabolic features. In this type of dormancy, germination may be prevented even if the environmental conditions favor growth.

=== Mitospores ===
In zygomycetes, mitospores (sporangiospores) are formed asexually. They are formed in specialized structures, the mitosporangia (sporangia) that contain few to several thousand of spores, depending on the species. Mitosporangia are carried by specialized hyphae, the mitosporangiophores (sporangiophores). These specialized hyphae usually show negative gravitropism and positive phototropism allowing good spore dispersal. The sporangia wall is thin and is easily destroyed by mechanical stimuli (e.g. falling raindrops, passing animals), leading to the dispersal of the ripe mitospores. The walls of these spores contain sporopollenin in some species. Sporopollenin is formed out of β-carotene and is very resistant to biological and chemical degradation. Zygomycete spores may also be classified in respect to their persistence:

=== Chlamydospores ===
Zygospore diagram and reproduction

Chlamydospores are asexual spores different from sporangiospores. The primary function of chlamydospores is the persistence of the mycelium and they are released when the mycelium degrades. Chlamydospores have no mechanism for dispersal. In zygomycetes the formation of chlamydospores is usually intercalar. However, it may also be terminal. In accordance with their function chlamydospores have a thick cell wall and are pigmented.

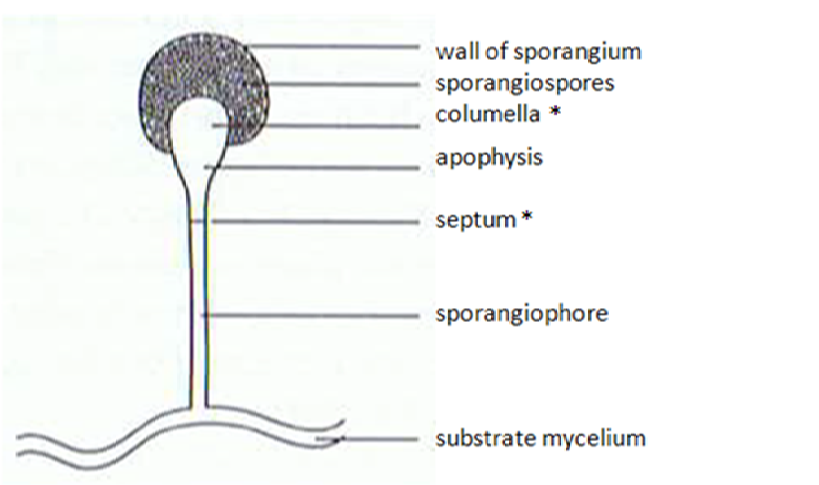
Sporangium.

== Zygophores ==
Zygophores are chemotropic aerial hyphae that are the sex organs of zygomycota, except for Phycomyces in which they are not aerial but found in the substratum. They have two different mating types (+) and (-). The opposite mating types grow towards each other due to volatile pheromones given off by the opposite strand, mainly trisporic acid and its precursors. Once two opposite mating types have made initial contact, they give rise to a zygospore through multiple steps.

Once contact between the zygophores has been made, their walls adhere to each other, flatten and then the contact site is referred to as the fusion septum. The tips of the zygophore become distended and form what is called the progametangia. A septum develops by gradual inward extension until it separates the terminal gametangia from the progametangial base. At this point the zygophore is then called the suspensor. Vesicles accumulate at the fusion septum at which time it begins to dissolve. A little before the fusion septum completely dissolves, the primary outer wall begins to thicken. This can be seen as dark patches on the primary wall as the fusion septum dissolves. These dark patches on the wall will eventually develop into warty structures that make up the thickness of the zygospore wall. As the zygospore enlarges, so do the warty structures until there are contiguous around the entire cell. At this point, electron microscopy can no longer penetrate the wall. Eventually the warts push through the primary wall and darken which is likely caused by melanin.

Meiosis usually occurs before zygospore germination and there are a few main types of distinguishable nuclear behavior. Type 1 is when the nuclei fuse quickly, within a few days, resulting in mature zygospore having haploid nuclei. Type 2 is when some nuclei do not pair and degenerate instead, meiosis is delayed until germination. Type 3 is when haploid nuclei continue to divide mitotically and then some associate into groups and some do not. This results in diploid and haploid nuclei being found in the germ sporangium.

== Cell wall ==
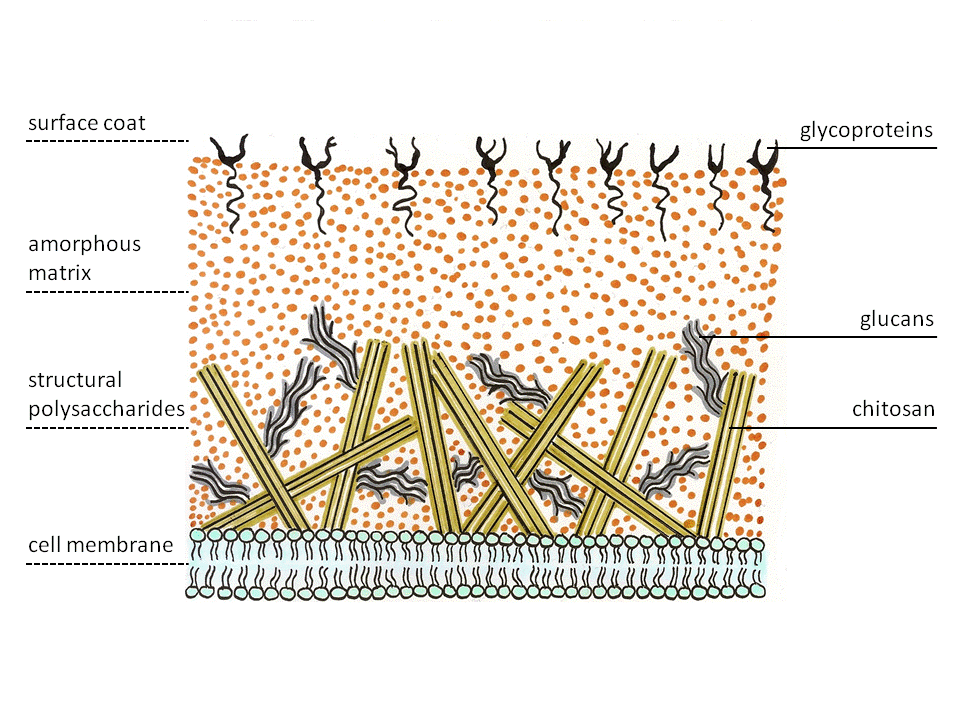
Typical fungal cell wall structure

Zygomycetes exhibit a special structure of cell wall. Most fungi have chitin as structural polysaccharide, while zygomycetes synthesize chitosan, the deacetylated homopolymer of chitin. Chitin is built of β-1,4 bonded N-acetyl glucosamine. Fungal hyphae grow at the tip. Therefore, specialized vesicles, the chitosomes, bring precursors of chitin and its synthesizing enzyme, chitin synthetase, to the outside of the membrane by exocytosis. The enzyme on the membrane catalyzes glycosidic bond formations from the nucleotide sugar substrate, uridine diphospho-N-acetyl-D-glucosamine. The nascent polysaccharide chain is then cleaved by the enzyme chitin deacetylase. The enzyme catalyzes the hydrolytic cleavage of the N-acetamido group in chitin. After this the chitosan polymer chain forms micro fibrils. These fibers are embedded in an amorphous matrix consisting of proteins, glucans (which putatively cross-link the chitosan fibers), mannoproteins, lipids and other compounds.

== Trisporic acid ==
Trisporic acid is a C-18 terpenoid compound that is synthesized via β-carotene and retinol pathways in the zygomycetes. It is a pheromone compound responsible for sexual differentiation in those fungal species.

=== History ===
Trisporic acid was discovered in 1964 as a metabolite that caused enhanced carotene production in Blakeslea trispora. It was later shown to be the hormone that brought about zygophore production in Mucor mucedo. The American mycologist and geneticist Albert Francis Blakeslee discovered that some species of Mucorales were self-sterile (heterothallic), in which interactions of two strains, designated (+) and (-), are necessary for the initiation of sexual activity. This interaction was found by Hans Burgeff of the University of Goettingen to be due to the exchange of low molecular weight substances that diffused through the substratum and atmosphere. This work constituted the first demonstration of sex hormone activity in any fungus. The elucidation of the hormonal control of sexual interaction in the Mucorales extends over 60 years and involved mycologists and biochemists from Germany, Italy, the Netherlands, the UK and the USA.

=== Functions of trisporic acid in Mucorales ===
Recognition of compatible sexual partners in zygomycota is based on a cooperative biosynthesis pathway of trisporic acid. Early trisporoid derivatives and trisporic acid induce swelling of two potential hyphae, hence called zygophores, and a chemical gradient of these inducer molecules results in a growth towards each other. These progametangia come in contact with each other and build a strong connection. In the next stage, septae are established to limit the developing zygospore from the vegetative mycelium and in this way the zygophores become suspensor hyphae and gametangia are formed. After dissolving of the fusion wall, cytoplasm and a high number of nuclei from both gametangia are mixed. A selectional process (unstudied) results in a reduction of nuclei and meiosis takes place (also unstudied until today). Several cell wall modifications, as well as incorporation of sporopollenin (responsible for the dark colour of spores) take place resulting in a mature zygospore.

Trisporic acid, as the endpoint of this recognition pathway, can solely be produced in presence of both compatible partners, which enzymatically produce trisporoid precursors to be further utilized by the potential sexual partner. Species specificity of these reactions is among others obtained by spatial segregation, physicochemical features of derivatives (volatility and light sensitivity), chemical modifications of trisporoids and transcriptional/posttranscriptional regulation.

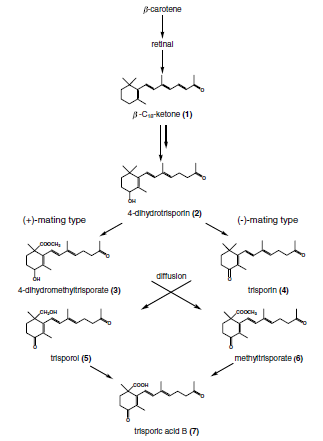
Postulated biosynthesis of trisporic acid B

=== Parasexualism ===
Trisporoids are also used in the mediation of the recognition between parasite and host. An example is the host-parasite interaction of a parasexual nature observed between Parasitella parasitica, a facultative mycoparasite of zygomycetes, and Absidia glauca. This interaction is an example for biotrophic fusion parasitism, because genetic information is transferred into the host. Many morphological similarities in comparison to zygospore formation are seen, but the mature spore is called a sikyospore and is parasitic. During this process, gall-like structures are produced by the host Absidia glauca. This, coupled with further evidence, has led to the assumption that trisporoids are not strictly species-specific, but that they might represent the general principle of mating recognition in Mucorales.

== Phototropism ==
Light regulation has been investigated in the zygomycetes Phycomyces blakesleeanus, Mucor circinelloides and Pilobolus crystallinus. For example, in Pilobolus crystallinus light is responsible for the dispersal mechanism and the sporangiophores of Phycomyces blakesleeanus grow towards light. When light, particularly blue light, is involved in the regulation of fungal development, it directs the growth of fungal structures and activates metabolic pathways. For instance, the zygomycota use light as signal to promote vegetative reproduction and growth of aerial hyphae to facilitate spore dispersal.

Fungal phototropism has been investigated in detail using the fruiting body, sporangiophore, of Phycomyces as a model. Phycomyces has a complex photoreceptor system. It is able to react to different light intensities and different wavelengths. In contrast to the positive reaction to blue light, there is also a negative reaction to UV light. Reactions to red light were also observed.

=== Activation of beta-carotene biosynthesis by light ===
The two genes for the enzymes phytoene desaturase (carB) and the bifunctional phytoene synthase/carotene cyclase (carRA in Phycomyces, carRP in Mucor) are responsible for synthesis of beta-carotene. The product of the gene crgA, which was found in Mucor suppresses the carotene formation by inhibiting the accumulation of carB and carRP mRNAs.

=== Influence of light in sporulation and sexual development ===
The zygomycete P. blakesleeanus builds two types of sporangiophores, the macrophores and the microphores which differ in size. The formation of these sporangiophores work at different light fluences and therefore with specific photoreceptors. Light also regulates asexual sporulation. In Mucor the product of the crgA gene acts as an activator. In contrast, the sexual development of Phycomyces is inhibited by light because of a specialized photoreceptor system.

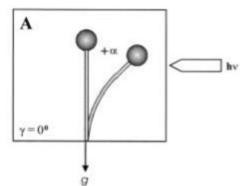
Bending angle in vertical sporangiophore

== Gravitropism ==
Gravitropism is a turning or growth movement by a plant or fungus in response to gravity. It is equally widespread in both kingdoms. Statolites are required in both fungi and plants for the mechanism of gravity-sensing. The Zygomycota sporangiophores originate from specialized “basal hyphae” and pass through several distinctive developmental stages until the mature asexual spores are released. In addition to the positive phototropism, the sporangiophores are directed by a negative gravitropic response into a position suitable for spore dispersal and distribution. Both responses are growth reactions i.e. the bending is caused by differential growth on the respective opposite flanks of the sporangiophore, and influence each other. The only model for the mechanism of the gravitropic reaction of Phycomyces is based on the floatability of the vacuole within the surrounding cytoplasm. The resulting asymmetric distribution of the cytoplasm is proposed to generate increased wall growth on the lower side of horizontally placed sporangiophores as in the thicker cytoplasmic layer forming there the number of vesicles secreting cell-wall material would be higher than on the upper side. Gravitropic bending starts after approximately 15 – 30 min in horizontally placed sporangiophores and continues until after, approximately 12 – 14 hours, the sporangiophore tip has recovered its original vertical position. Usually, the gravitropic response is weaker compared to the phototrophic one. However, in certain conditions, equilibrium could be established and the responses are comparable. In plants and fungi, phototropism and gravitropism interact in a complex manner. During continuous irradiation with unilateral light, the sporangiophore (fruiting body) of the zygomycete fungus, Phycomyces blakesleeanus reach a bending angle of photogravitropic equilibrium at which the gravitropic and phototropic stimuli balance each other (Fig. 1, bending angle +α, due to light irradiation).

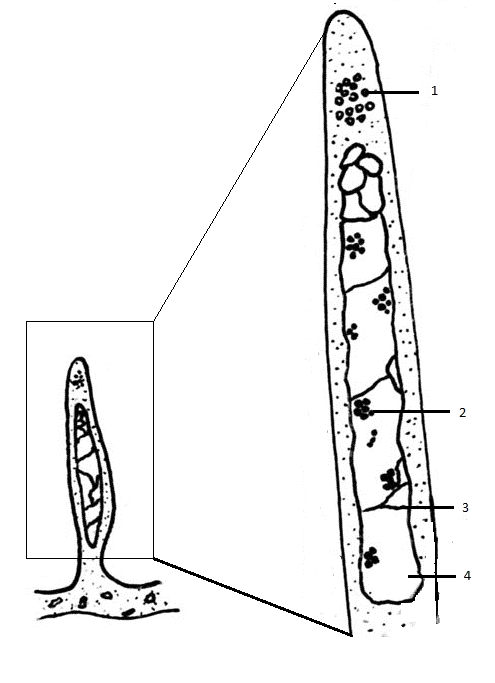
Lipid globules and protein crystals in sporangiophore. 1. Lipid globules; 2. Protein crystals; 3. Vacuolar transepts; 4. Central vacuole

=== Protein crystals involved in graviperception ===
In Phycomyces blakesleeanus, wild type sporangiophores contain large, easily seen octahedral paracrystalline crystals with size up to 5×5×5 μm. Generally, they are found near the main vacuole in clusters consisting of more than ten crystals. They are often associated to the vacuolar transepts. Sedimentation with speed of about 100 μm/s can be observed when the sporangiophores are tilted. Sliding along during sedimentation or pulling at the vacuolar membranes and transepts serves as an inter-cellular signal to a probable cytoskeleton response, and that activates receptors located in the cell membrane. These receptors in turn trigger a chain of events which finally leads to the asymmetrical growth of the cell wall. Studies of the bending angle of wild type and mutant strain sporangiophore growth have shown that mutant strains that do not have crystals exhibit reduced gravitropic response.

=== Lipid droplets involved in graviperception ===
Complex of apical lipid globules are also involved in graviperception. These lipids are clustered in cellular structures, complex of lipid globules, about 0.1mm below the very tip of the apex. (Fig. 2) The globules migrate to the columella when the sporangium is formed. In mature stage this complex is believed to act as a gravireceptor due to its floatability. Mutants that lack this lipid complex show greatly lowered gravitropic response.

== Phylogeny ==
Historically, all fungi producing a zygospore were considered to be related and placed into Zygomycota. The use of molecular phylogenetics has increasingly revealed this grouping to be paraphyletic. However, the rank (i.e., phylum or subphylum) these clades is in dispute. What follows is a phylogeny of fungi with the zygomycete subphyla derived from Spatafora et al. (2016) with both possible phylum names.

- - - subphylum Zoopagomycotina, phylum Zoopagomycota
    - subphylum Kickxellomycotina, phylum Kickxellomycota or Zoopagomycota
  - - order Basidiobolales, subphylum Entomophthoromycotina, phylum Basidiolomycota, Entomophthoromycota, or Zoopagomycota
    - order Entomophthorales, subphylum Entomophthoromycotina, phylum Entomophthoromycota or Zoopagomycota
- - - subphylum Glomeromycotina, phylum Glomeromycota or Mucoromycota
    - - subphylum Mortierollomycotina, phylum Mortierellomycota or Mucoromycota
      - subphylum Mucoromycotina, phylum Mucoromycota
  - Dikarya

== Industrial uses ==
Many species of zygomycetes can be used in important industrial processes. A resume of them is presented in the table.

Species	Product	Uses
Several Mucor and Rhizopus spp.	Lipases and proteases	Leather, detergent and medical industry (steroid transformation)
Rhizopus	Cellulases	Food production (i.e., tempeh)
R. oryzae, other Rhizopus spp.	Fumaric acid	Diverse
Rhizopus spp.	Lactic acid	Diverse
R. delemar	Biotin	Diverse
Mortierella romanniana, Mortierella vinacea and Mucor indicus	Linolenic acid	Diverse
Mortierella alpina	Arachidonic acid	Diverse
Blakeslea trispora	β-carotene	Diverse

=== Culture conditions ===
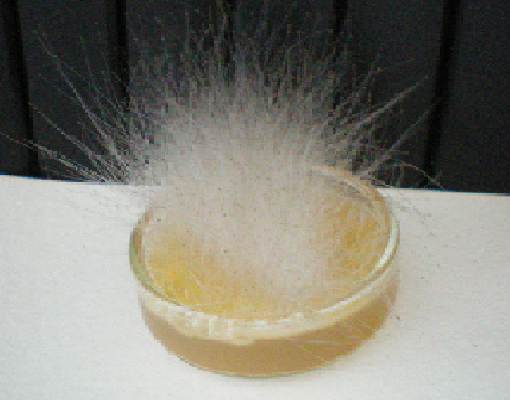
Zygomycetes on solid media

The zygomycetes are able to grow in a wide range of environments. Most of them are mesophilic (growing at 10–40 °C with an optimum 20–35 °C), but some, like Mucor miehei or Mucor pusillus, are thermophilic with a minimum growth temperature of about 20 °C and maximum extending up to 60 °C. Others like Mucor hiemalis can grow at temperatures below 0 °C.

Some species of the order Mucorales are able to grow under anaerobic conditions, while most of them require aerobic conditions. Furthermore, while the majority of the zygomycetes only grow at high water activities, some of them are able to grow in salt concentrations of at least 15%. Most species of Mucor grow rapidly on agar at room temperature filling the Petri dish in 2–3 days with their coarse aerial mycelium. When incubated in liquid culture under semi-anaerobic conditions, several species grow in yeast like state. Zygospore formation may be stimulated at higher temperatures of incubation (30–40 °C).

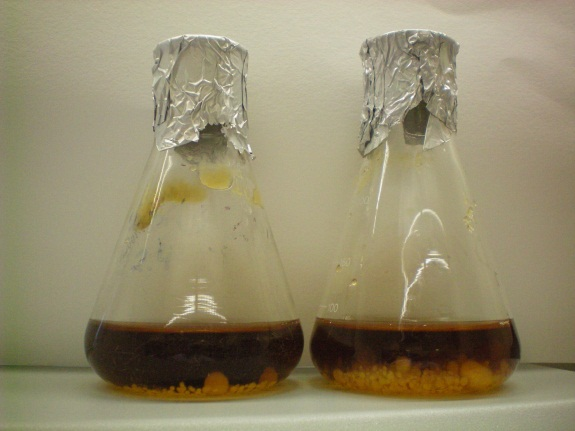
Zygomycetes on Sub-media, in light and non-light condition

Growth of Zygomycota in solid agar can produce low or very high fibrous colony that rapidly fills the entire Petri dish. Its color may range from pure white to shades of gray or brown. In old cultures, dark pigmented sporangia are observed. Everything depends on the species and the media used. In liquid culture, Zygomycota usually form a bland mass and do not produce spores. This is because they cannot grow aerial hyphae.

=== Culture media ===
Zygomycetes grow well on most standard fungal culture medium such as Sabouraud dextrose agar. They can also grow on both selective and non-selective media. Minimal media, supplementary media and induction media can also be used. Most zygomycetes are sensitive to cycloheximide (actidione) and this agent should not be used in culture media.

== Reproduction ==
A common example of a zygomycete is black bread mold (Rhizopus stolonifer), a member of the Mucorales. It spreads over the surface of bread and other food sources, sending hyphae inward to absorb nutrients. In its asexual phase it develops bulbous black sporangia at the tips of upright hyphae, each containing hundreds of haploid spores.

As in most zygomycetes, asexual reproduction is the most common form of reproduction. Sexual reproduction in Rhizopus stolonifer, as in other zygomycetes, occurs when haploid hyphae of different mating types are in close proximity to each other. Growth of the gametangia commences after gametangia come in contact, and plasmogamy, or the fusion of the cytoplasm, occurs. Karyogamy, which is the fusion of the nuclei, follows closely after. The zygosporangia are then diploid. Zygosporangia are typically thick-walled, highly resilient to environmental hardships, and metabolically inert. When conditions improve, however, they germinate to produce a sporangium or vegetative hyphae. Meiosis occurs during germination of the zygosporangium so the resulting spores or hyphae are haploid. Grows in warm and damp conditions.

Some zygomycetes disperse their spores in a more precise manner than simply allowing them to drift aimlessly on air currents. Pilobolus, a fungus which grows on animal dung, bends its sporangiophores towards light with the help of a light sensitive pigment (beta-carotene) and then "fires" them with an explosive squirt of high-pressure cytoplasm. Sporangia can be launched as far as 2 m, placing them far away from the dung and hopefully on vegetation which will be eaten by an herbivore, eventually to be deposited with dung elsewhere. Different mechanisms for forcible spore discharge have evolved among members of the zygomycete order Entomophthorales.

== Evolution of conidia ==
The evolution of the conidium from the sporangiospore is the main defining difference between zygomycetes and ascomycetes. The evolution of sporangiospores typical of zygomycetes to conidia similar to those found in ascomycetes can be modeled by a series of forms seen in zygomycetes. Many zygomycetes produce multiple sporangiospores inside a single sporangium. Some have evolved multiple small sporangiola that contain few sporangiospores. In some cases, there may be a few as three spores in each sporangiolum, and a few species have sporangiola which contain just a single spore. Choanephora, a zygomycete, has a sporangiolum that contains one spore with a sporangium wall that is visible at the base of the sporangium. This structure is similar to a conidium, which has two, fused cell walls, an inner spore wall and an outer sporangium wall.
