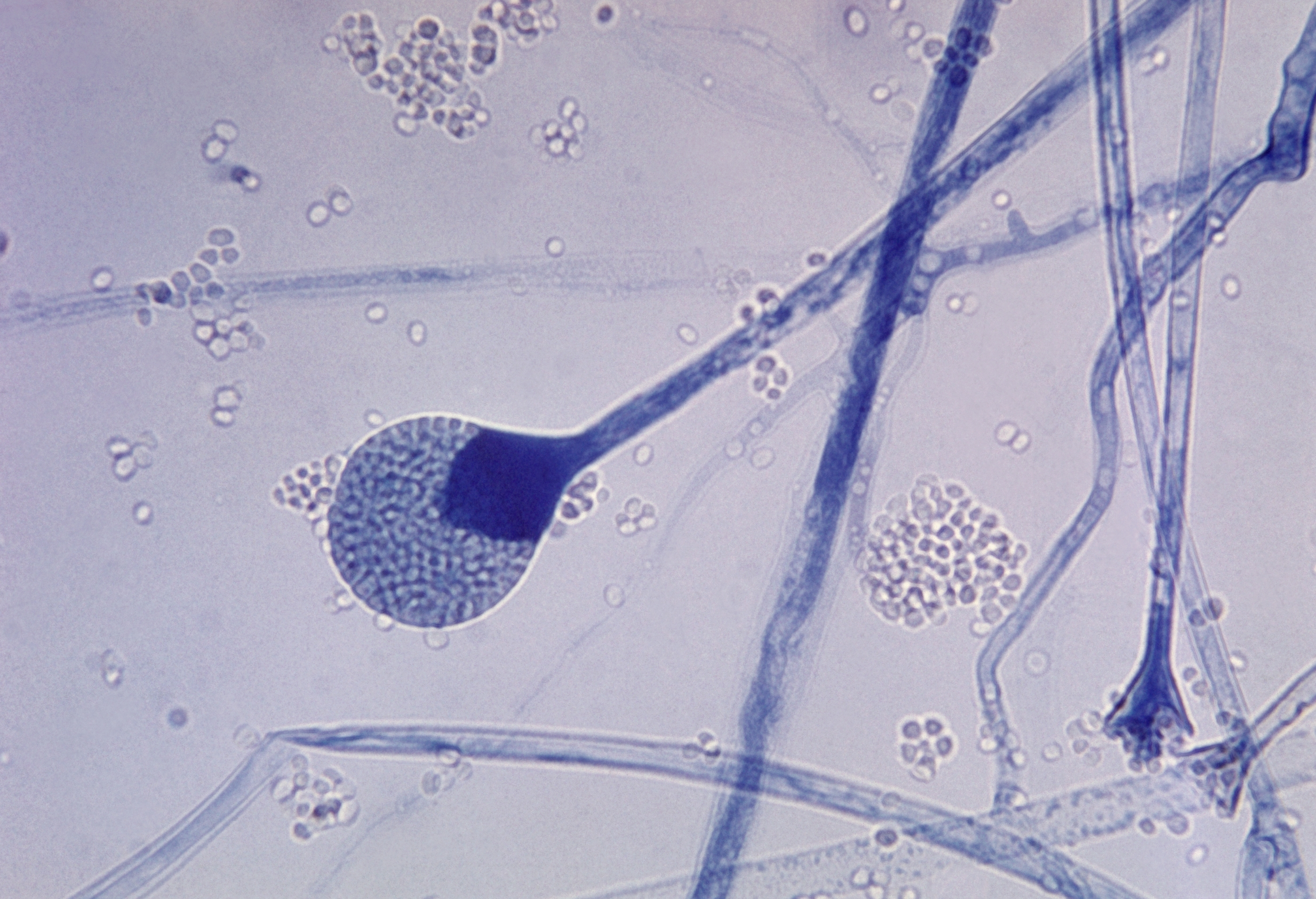
- A sporangium of a Mucoralean fungus

Scientific classification
- Kingdom: Fungi
- Subkingdom: Mucoromyceta
- Division: Mucoromycota; Doweld 2001, emend. Tedersoo et al. 2018
- Subdivision: Mucoromycotina; Benny

Orders
- Mucoromycetes; Mucorales; Endogonomycetes; Endogonales

= Mucoromycotina =

Subphylum of fungi

Mucoromycotina is a subphylum of uncertain placement in Fungi. It was considered part of the phylum Zygomycota, but recent phylogenetic studies have shown that it was polyphyletic and thus split into several groups, it is now thought to be a paraphyletic grouping. Mucoromycotina is currently composed of 3 orders, 61 genera, and 325 species. Some common characteristics seen throughout the species include: development of coenocytic mycelium, saprotrophic lifestyles, and filamentous.

With the treatment of Tedersoo et al. 2018, Mucoromycotina is the only subphylum under Mucoromycota. It includes a diverse group of various molds, including the common bread molds Mucor and Rhizopus. The other treatment of Mucoromycota is equivalent to current Mucoromyceta.

== History ==
Zygomycete fungi were originally only ascribed to the phylum Zygomycota. Such classifications were based on physiological characteristics with little genetic support. A genetic study of Zygomycete fungi performed in 2016 showed that further classification of the group was possible, thus splitting it into Zoopagomycota, Entomophthoromycota, Kickxellomycotina, and Mucoromycotina. The study put these groups as being sister to Dikarya, but without further research, their exact locations in Fungi remain unknown. Many of the questions regarding these groups stem from the difficulty of collecting and growing them in culture, so the current groupings are based on the few that have been successfully collected and which could undergo genomic testing with a certain level of accuracy.

== Taxonomy ==
The exact placement of Mucoromycotina is currently unknown. It currently resides in the subphyla incertae sedis, alongside Zoopagomycota, Entomophthoromycota, and Kickxellomycotina, whose’ placements are also currently unknown. These groups originally comprised Zygomycota alongside others that were assigned to Glomeromycota, which was elevated to phylum in 2001. These groups are sister to Dikarya, which contains Ascomycota and Basidiomycota.

Studies have currently divided Mucoromycotina into 3 orders: Endognales, Mucorales, and Mortierellales. All three orders contain species that are saprotrophic, with others forming relationships with other organisms. There are still many questions regarding Mucoromycotina and the organisms that compose it, owing to limited collected samples.

== Orders ==
=== Endogonales ===
This order currently contains 2 families, (Endogonaceae and Densosporaceae) 7 genera, and 40 species. Not much is known about this order, other than readily noticeable characteristics. They produce subterranean sporocarps, which are ingested by small mammals attracted by the fetid odor they produce. Cultured specimens have shown that they produce coenocytic mycelium, and can be saprotrophic or mycorrhizal. This order was first described in 1931 by Jacz. & P.A.Jacz., after being monographed in 1922 by Thaxter.

=== Mucorales ===
Often referred to as pin molds, members of this order produce sporangia held up on hyphae, called sporangiophores. There are currently 13 families in this order, divided into 56 genera, and approximately 300 species. They can be parasitic or saprotrophic in nature and reproduce asexually. Much is known about this order since some of the species cause damage to stored food, with several others causing mycosis in immune compromised individuals. The order was proposed in 1878 by van Tieghem, as the examined samples did not fit in with what was Entomophthorales at the time.

== Ecology ==
The species described in this subphylum have evolved 3 main lifestyles: saprotrophic, mycorrhizal, or parasitic. Saprotrophic species are involved in decomposition of organic matter, mycorrhizal species form symbiotic relationships with plants, and parasitic species form harmful symbiotic relationships with other organisms.

=== Saprotrophs ===
Saprotrophs breakdown decomposing matter into different components: proteins into amino acids, lipids into fatty acids and glycerol, and starches into disaccharides. The species responsible usually require excess water, oxygen, pH less than 7, and low temperatures.

=== Parasitism ===
Parasitic species seen in Mucorales cause infections in crops and immune compromised animals.

A common infection of plants by some species in Mucorales is referred to as crown rot or stem rot, common symptoms are: rotting near the soil line, rotting on one side or on lateral branches. Treatment is difficult if not caught in its early stages, and usually results in the death of the plant. Crown rot is seen in cereal plants (wheat, barley), with experiments from 2015 showing crop losses at 0.01 t/ha per unit increase in crown rot index or more. In addition to cereal plants, crown rot is seen in strawberries and other such low growing plants.

=== Mycorrhizal ===
Mycorrhizal, literally “fungus-root”, interactions are symbioses between fungi and plants. Such interactions are based on nutrient acquisition and sharing, the fungi increases the range over which nutrients are gathered and the plant provides materials that the fungi cannot produce. There are two main types of interactions: arbuscular endomycorrhizal, and ectomycorrhizal. Arbuscular endomycorrhizal interactions are when the fungi is allowed to enter the plant, and inhabit special cells. The fungi produce structures that look like trees, called “arbuscules,” inside these cells. Mucoromycotina within the Planticonsortiaceae form arbuscular mycorrhizae (M-AMF) which have similar ecology and morphology to mycorrhizae formed by Glomeromycota. Ectomycorrhizal interactions are similar symbioses, however the fungi are not allowed into any plant cells, though they may grow between them.

== Plant-microbe interactions ==
=== Endogonales ===
A new genus proposed in 2017, Jimgerdemannia, contains species with an ectomycorrhizal trophic mode. Further research is needed to understand these species. Several studies have observed fossils of some potential members forming mycorrhizal interactions with ancient plants.

The genus Endogone is important in nutrient-deficient soils, such as sand dunes. The presence of species in this genus stabilizes the soil and provides some assistance to dune plants.

Planticonsortiacae form ‘fine root endophyte’ (FRE) arbuscular mycorrhizae with higher plants. These are often termed Mucoromycotina arbuscular mycorrhizal fungi (M-AMF) since other fungi from the Mucoromycotina may have the potential to form arbuscular mycorrhizae within plant roots.

=== Mucorales ===
Some species in the genus Mucor are well known for causing crown rot in cereal plants and damage to stored foods.

== Evolution ==
A genome study of Rhizophagus irregularis performed in 2013 supported the hypothesis that Glomeromycota was responsible for early plant-fungi symbiotic relationships. A paper released in 2015 suggests that a Mucoromycotina species formed a symbiotic relationships with liverworts during the Paleozoic era, which may have been the first plant-fungi symbiotic relationship.

Phylogenetic studies have been unable to place Mucoromycotina in any definitive location within fungi, however some research has suggested that the lineage is fairly old. Due to recent advancements allowing for better phylogenetic studies, species assigned to closely related groups are being reassigned to Mucoromycotina, one such species being Rhizophagus irregularis.

== Broader implications ==
=== Phylogeny ===
With the improvement of phylogenetic studies, the placement of several established groups in fungi have been called into question. There is some debate regarding the relationship between Mucoromycotina and Glomeromycota, with some species currently in Glomeromycota being moved to Mucoromycotina.

=== Environment ===
The genus Endogone in Endogonales, contains species that grow in sand dunes, aiding the plants that grow in the nutrient-poor soils. The mycelium that is formed also plays a role in soil stabilization, preventing erosion. Other species produce fruiting bodies that are included in the diets of various small rodent species.

Species found in Mortierella of Mortierellales have roles in decomposition of organic matter. Some species are among the first to colonize new roots, and others have shared a relationship with spruce trees, though the exact nature in unknown.

== Disease ==
=== Crown rot ===
Crown rot is a plant disease caused by species in Mucorales. The disease is characterized by rotting tissue at or near where the stem meets the soil. Treatment is difficult if not caught in its early stages, and usually results in the death of the plant. Crown rot is seen in cereal plants (wheat, barley), with experiments from 2015 showing crop losses at 0.01 t/ha per unit increase in crown rot index or more. In addition to cereal plants, crown rot is seen in strawberries and other such low growing plants.

=== Zygomycosis ===
Fungal infection seen in animals with compromised immune systems, meaning the host is already sick before the fungus invades and inhabits the body. Also referred to as Mucoromycosis, depending on the species.

== Uses ==
A study was conducted examining insecticidal properties of several fungi species, Mortierella was included. The study focused on species isolated from Antarctica, with the intention of identifying potentially useful adaptations. They found that the Mortierella species examined was shown to have some insecticidal properties against waxmoth and housefly larvae. Further research is needed to determine the process by which this is possible, and potential usefulness.

== Problems ==
A recurring problem with study of this phylum, is the difficulty in culturing specimens. Many of the species identified and used in phylogenetic studies, or others, have been collected in the field with few of them being cultured in labs. Such an issue impacts the ability to produce extensive phylogenetic trees, resulting in the currently unknown location of the phylum in fungi.
