= Josephine Milne =

Australian bryologist

- Born: 1957 (age 68–69)
- Education: Deakin University
- Scientific career
- Fields: Bryology
- Workplaces: Royal Botanic Gardens Victoria
- Thesis: Studies of the biology of four species of Dicranoloma (1997)
- Doctoral advisor: George A.M. Scott
- Author abbrev. (botany): J.Milne

Josephine (Pina) Milne is an Australian bryologist, and former Manager Collections at the National Herbarium of Victoria at the Royal Botanic Gardens Victoria.

== Education and career ==
Milne completed a Bachelor of Education in Environmental Studies in 1978, with a double major in Biology and Geography. She then taught biology, science and geography for eleven years at Our Lady of the Sacred Heart Secondary College, in Bentleigh, Melbourne. Following this, Milne tutored students in animal biology, genetics and human physiology at Deakin University, before beginning a PhD on the reproductive biology of four species of the moss genus, Dicranoloma.

In April 1997, Milne took up a short-term position at the Royal Botanic Gardens Victoria databasing moss specimens. She was asked to stay on and began to work on several projects, including with mycologist Tom May (mycologist). This work yielded several publications, including one volume of the Fungi of Australia. Milne worked on flora treatments of mosses with Niels Klazenga, as well as the Forgotten Flora Project alongside Teresa Lebel and Anneke Veenstra.

In 2006, Milne was appointed Manager Collections at the National Herbarium of Victoria. During this time, she was responsible for all aspects of collections management and making the collection accessible to researchers in Australia and around the globe. She was involved in the Managers of Australasian Herbarium Collections (MAHC) group, which develops, promotes and implements collections management policy, guidelines and best practice for herbaria in the region. Milne was also central in securing the herbarium of renowned Australian bryologist Ilma Grace Stone for the National Herbarium of Victoria. Milne was a Councillor of the Australian Systematic Botany Society from September 2010 to September 2011, then Assistant Treasurer from September 2011 to September 2013. Milne has been instrumental in managing, promoting and gaining funding for the digitisation of the large non-Australia component of the National Herbarium of Victoria. Milne retired as Manager Collections in November 2021. She hopes to return to the Royal Botanic Gardens Victoria as an Honorary Associate to continue her research in bryology.

== Botanical collections ==
Milne's plant collections are held in various Australasian herbaria. The majority of her collections, totalling over 1700, are housed at the National Herbarium of Victoria, Royal Botanic Gardens Victoria. There are duplicates at State Herbarium of South Australia, the National Herbarium of New South Wales, the Queensland Herbarium, the Tasmanian Herbarium, the Australian National Herbarium, the Manaaki Whenua – Landcare Research, the Auckland War Memorial Museum, and the Western Australian Herbarium.

== Standard author abbreviation ==
The standard author abbreviation J.Milne is used to indicate this person as the author when citing a botanical name.

== Selected published taxa ==
- Austroriella Cargill & J.Milne
- Austroriella salta J.Milne & Cargill

== Selected publications ==
=== Journal articles ===
- Milne, J. (2000). Gemmae in Dicranoloma serratum (Broth.) Par. Journal of Bryology 22, 70–72
- Milne, J. (2001). Reproductive biology of three Australian species of Dicranoloma (Bryopsida, Dicranaceae): sexual reproduction and phenology. The Bryologist 104, 440–452
- Cargill, D.C., and Milne, J. (2013) A new terrestrial genus and species within the aquatic liverwort family Riellaceae (Sphaerocarpales) from Australia. Polish Botanical Journal 58(1), 71–80.
- Milne, J. (2020). Retracing history through herbarium specimens. Studies in Western Australian History 35, 75–87

=== Books ===
- May, T.W., Milne, J., Shingles, S. and Jones, R.H. (2003). Fungi of Australia, vol. 2B: catalogue and bibliography of Australian macrofungi 2. Basidiomycota p.p. and Myxomycota p.p. CSIRO, Canberra

=== Book chapters ===
- Milne, J. and Short, M. (1999). Invertebrates in the moss Dicranoloma Ren. In W. Ponder and D. Lunnery (eds), The Other 99%: the conservation and biodiversity of invertebrates, pp. 129–132. Royal Zoological Society of New South Wales, Mosman

=== Educational resources ===
- Lebel, T., Milne, J. and Veenstra-Quah, A. (2004). Set of 10 posters. Forgotten Flora. Royal Botanic Gardens Melbourne, South Yarra.
- Milne, J. and Lebel, T. (2004). Set of 3 CDs. Forgotten Flora: Fungi, Lichen, Bryophytes. Royal Botanic Gardens Melbourne, South Yarra.

== Legacy ==
The following taxon has been named in her honour: Dactylasioptera milnae Veenstra & Kolesik
