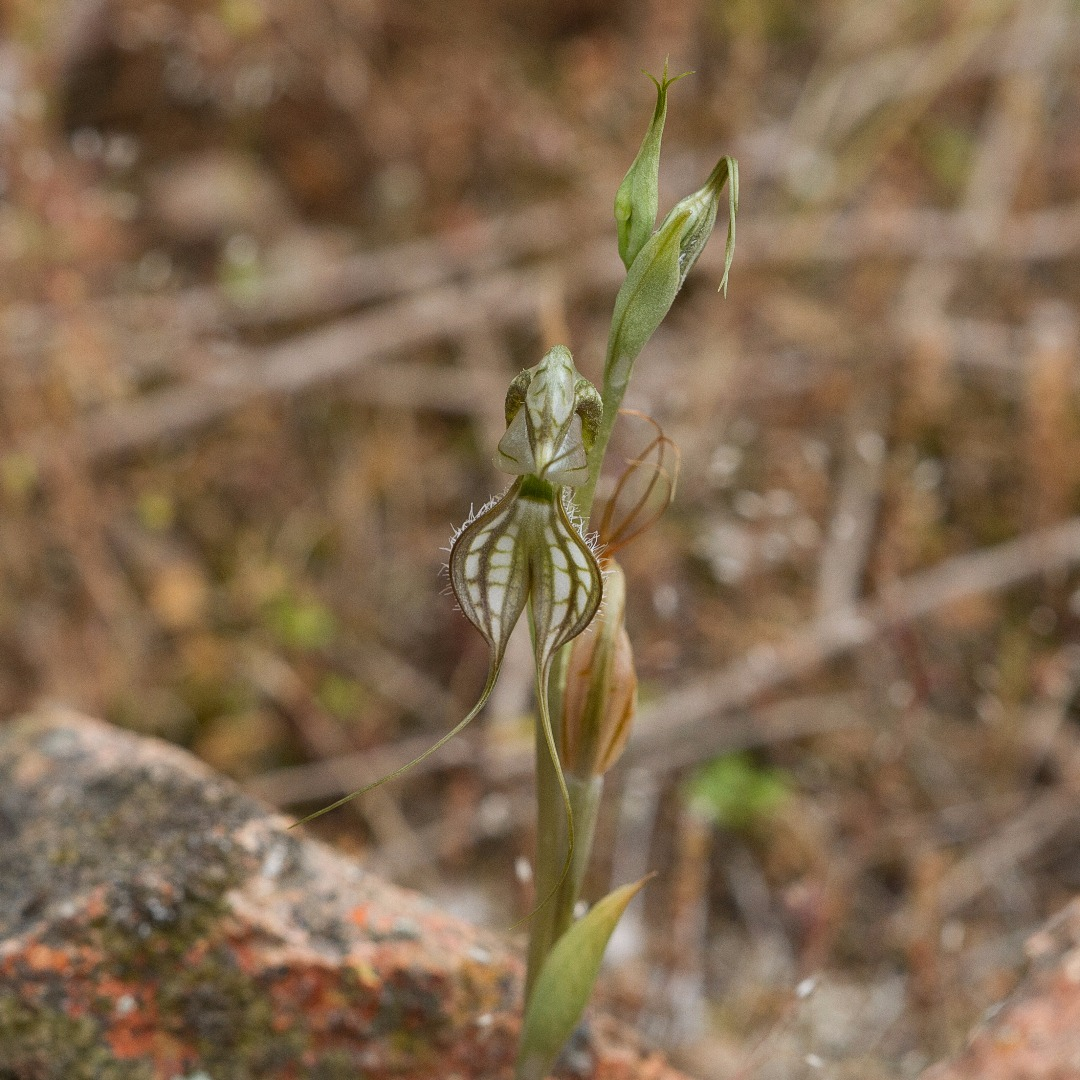
- Pterostylis biseta growing near Keith

Scientific classification
- Kingdom: Plantae
- Clade: Tracheophytes
- Clade: Angiosperms
- Clade: Monocots
- Order: Asparagales
- Family: Orchidaceae
- Subfamily: Orchidoideae
- Tribe: Cranichideae
- Genus: Pterostylis
- Species: P. biseta

Binomial name
- Pterostylis biseta Blackmore & Clemesha

Synonyms
- Oligochaetochilus bisetus (Blackmore & Clemesha) Szlach.

= Pterostylis biseta =

Bristled rustyhood

Species of orchid

Pterostylis biseta, commonly known as the bristled rustyhood, is a plant in the orchid family Orchidaceae and is endemic to south-eastern Australia. It has a rosette of leaves at its base and up to seven relatively large, translucent flowers with green and brown marking with a brown to green insect-like labellum with bristly hairs. It occurs in New South Wales, South Australia and Victoria although in the latter state it has been separated into three species and is also under review in New South Wales.

== Description ==
Pterostylis biseta, is a terrestrial, perennial, deciduous, herb with an underground tuber. It has a rosette of between six and fourteen leaves at the base of the flowering spike, each leaf 15–40 mm (0.6–2 in) long and 8–12 mm (0.3–0.5 in) wide. The leaves are often withered by the time of flowering. Up to seven translucent green and brown flowers 50–58 mm (2.0–2.3 in) long and 12–14 mm (0.5–0.6 in) wide are borne on a flowering spike 100–350 mm (4–10 in) tall. Two to six papery bracts are wrapped around the flowering spike. The dorsal sepal and petals are joined to form a hood called the "galea" over the column with the dorsal sepal having a thread-like tip 11–15 mm (0.4–0.6 in) long. The lateral sepals are wider than the galea, dished, densely hairy on their outer edges and suddenly taper to a thread-like tip. The lateral sepals are more or less parallel to each other, and the tips are 25–35 mm (0.98–1.4 in) long. The labellum is brown to green, thin and insect-like, 6–8 mm (0.2–0.3 in) long and about 4 mm (0.2 in) wide. The "head" end is swollen with two long bristles and there are up to 34 shorter bristles on the side. Flowering occurs from September to November.

== Taxonomy and naming ==
The bristly rustyhood was first formally described in 1968 by John Blackmore and Stephen Clemesha from a specimen collected near Blackwood and the description was published in The Orchadian. The specific epithet (biseta) is derived from the Latin prefix bi- meaning "two" and the word seta meaning "bristle".

The taxonomy of this species is under review. The National Herbarium of Victoria has split the species into Pterostylis despectans, P. planulata and P. sp. aff. biseta (Pink Lakes). The National Herbarium of New South Wales reports that the species is "under review".

== Distribution and habitat ==
Pterostylis biseta as currently described by the National Herbarium of New South Wales, occurs in that state south from Hillston, in northern Victoria and in the south-east of South Australia. It grows in sparse forest, often on rocky ridges, and in arid scrubland.
