= Australasian Virtual Herbarium =

Online herbarium showing botanical occurrence data

- Available in: English
- Website: avh.chah.org.au
- Commercial: No
- Current status: Active

The Australasian Virtual Herbarium (AVH) is an online resource that allows access to plant specimen data held by various Australian and New Zealand herbaria. It is part of the Atlas of Living Australia (ALA), and was formed by the amalgamation of Australia's Virtual Herbarium and NZ Virtual Herbarium. As of 12 August 2014, more than five million specimens of the 8 million and upwards specimens available from participating institutions have been databased.

== Uses ==
This resource is used by academics, students, and anyone interested in research in botany in Australia or New Zealand, since each record tells all that is known about the specimen: where and when it was collected; by whom; its current identification together with the botanist who identified it; and information on habitat and associated species. ALA post processes the original herbarium data, giving further fields with respect to taxonomy and quality of the data. When interrogating individual specimen records, the environmental overlays show reverse jackknife testing to see whether the specimen is an outlier with respect to the climate and other environmental layers.

All records are downloadable in their entirety, by anyone. Examples of the use of these records may be found in

- journal articles on: e.g., sea warming; marine biogeography; acacias; weeds; determining phytogeographical regions via species composition; developing biodiverse plantings suitable for changing climatic conditions; phylogenetics and conservation; and statistical issues arising when using herbaria data
- some Wikipedia range maps for, e.g., Tribonanthes violacea, Blancoa canescens and Haemodorum coccineum.

A Google Scholar search using the phrase Australia's Virtual Herbarium shows that well over 200 articles (as of 3 May 2018) have been published using data from this resource.

== Participating herbaria ==
- The State Herbarium of South Australia (AD), Department of Environment, Water and Natural Resources
- Auckland War Memorial Museum (AK)
- The Queensland Herbarium (BRI), Department of Science, Information Technology and Innovation (DSITI)
- The Australian National Herbarium (CANB), Centre for Plant Biodiversity Research, CSIRO Plant Industry and the Australian National Botanic Gardens
- The University of Canterbury Herbarium (CANU), University of Canterbury
- The Allan Herbarium (CHR), Landcare Research NZ Ltd
- The Australian Tropical Herbarium (CNS), a joint venture of CSIRO Plant Industry and the Director National Parks (through the Australian National Herbarium), the Queensland Government (through the Queensland Herbarium and the Department of Science, Information Technology, Innovation and the Arts (DSITIA)) and James Cook University
- The Northern Territory Herbarium, in Darwin (DNA) and Alice Springs (NT), Department of Environment and Natural Resources
- The Tasmanian Herbarium (HO), Tasmanian Museum and Art Gallery, Department of State Growth
- The James Cook University Herbarium (JCT), James Cook University
- The Lincoln University Herbarium (LINC), Lincoln University
- The La Trobe University Herbarium (LTB)
- The National Herbarium of Victoria (MEL), Royal Botanic Gardens Victoria
- The University of Melbourne Herbarium (MELU)
- The Dame Ella Campbell Herbarium (MPN), Massey University
- The N.C.W. Beadle Herbarium (NE), The University of New England
- The National Herbarium of New South Wales (NSW), Botanic Gardens Trust
- The New Zealand Forestry Herbarium (NZFRI), SCION
- The New Zealand Fungarium (PDD), Landcare Research NZ Ltd
- The Western Australian Herbarium (PERTH), Department of Biodiversity, Conservation and Attractions
- The Herbarium (UNITEC), Unitec Institute of Technology
- The Herbarium (WELT), Museum of New Zealand – Te Papa Tongarewa
- The Janet Cosh Herbarium (WOLL), The University of Wollongong

Herbaria and their codes may be found at Wikipedia's list of herbaria which is based on the New York Botanical Garden's continuously updated index.

== History ==
Plans for Australia's Virtual Herbarium (AVH) were announced in 2001. An article by Tim Entwisle in 2003 shows it still to be largely in the planning stage at that time, although the projected usages for preservation of biodiversity in western New South Wales were already visible. Between 2001 and 2006 the label data from herbaria were databased and in 2012 the site AVH was relaunched using the infrastructure of the Atlas of Living Australia. In June 2017 the New Zealand Virtual Herbarium was integrated leading to the Australasian Virtual Herbarium.

== See also ==
- Atlas of Living Australia (ALA) – ALA and AVH are closely linked, with downloads from AVH hosted by ALA.
- Global Biodiversity Information Facility (GBIF) also permits unfettered access to global species collections data
