= Neosarcodon carbonarius =

- Neosarcodon carbonarius from Fiordland

Scientific classification
- Kingdom: Fungi
- Division: Basidiomycota
- Class: Agaricomycetes
- Order: Thelephorales
- Family: Bankeraceae
- Genus: Neosarcodon
- Species: N. carbonarius

Binomial name
- Neosarcodon carbonarius (Maas Geest.) J.A. Cooper & T.W. May

Synonyms
- Sarcodon carbonarius Maas Geest.; Hydnum carbonarium G.Cunn.

Species of fungus

Neosarcodon carbonarius is a species of fungi in the family Bankeraceae that is endemic to New Zealand and found on all three main islands. It was originally described in the genus Hydnum in 1958 by New Zealand mycologist G.H. Cunningham and later placed in the genus Sarcodon, but morphological and DNA analyses in 2024 placed it in the genus Neosarcodon.

== Description ==
A dark-coloured tooth (hydnoid) fungus with a fruitbody that has a charcoal-black cap up to 80 mm across, densely distributed short (to 3 mm) fine pale spines below, soft flesh and a thick stipe. The cap can reach 80 mm across.

== Taxonomy ==
Neosarcodon carbonarius is a fungus in the family Bankeraceae. The species was originally described as Hydnum carbonarium in 1958 by New Zealand mycologist G.H. Cunningham. It was then transferred to the genus Sarcodon in 1964 by Dutch mycologist Rudolf Arnold Maas Geesteranus, as Sarcodon carbonarius. In 2024, it was transferred to the genus Neosarcodon by New Zealand mycologist Jerry A. Cooper and Australian mycologist Tom W. May based on analyses of morphology and nuclear ribosomal DNA sequences of the internal transcribed spacer (ITS) region (ITS barcode) and partial 28S rDNA (28S) region.

The type specimen was collected at Half Moon Bay, Stewart Island in February 1954 by Joan Dingley and is housed at the New Zealand Fungarium (PDD 17707).

The species epithet carbonarius refers to the colour, as Cunningham explains in the original description, "Plants appear as if constructed from charcoal, being carbonous and fragile."

Neosarcodon carbonarius is similar morphologically to the North American species Sarcodon atroviridis and Asian species S. thwaitesii. Some Australasian specimens in past publications and databases have been identified as Sarcodon thwaitesii, but these are misidentifications and are better attributed to N. carbonarius or Hydnellum nothofagacearum.

Phylogenetic analyses of the ITS barcode and 28S region placed the two sequenced individuals of N. carbonarius within a highly supported Neosarcodon clade, which was separate from the Sarcodon clade and the Hydnellum clade.

== Distribution and habitat ==
Neosarcodon carbonarius is endemic to New Zealand. It occurs on the North Island, South Island and Stewart Island, and is typically found and collected in April and May. It lives in native forest in soil, often where there is moss, humus or leaf litter. It is associated with podocarps or species such as Dacrydium cupressinum or species in the family Myrtaceae (or with Nothofagus species but this is disputed). N. carbonarius may be non-ectomycorrhizal and its trophic status needs further study.

== Gallery ==
Cap and stipe

Underside showing teeth

Mushroom growing in leaf litter

Underside of cap with teeth or spines
