= State Botanical Collection of Victoria =

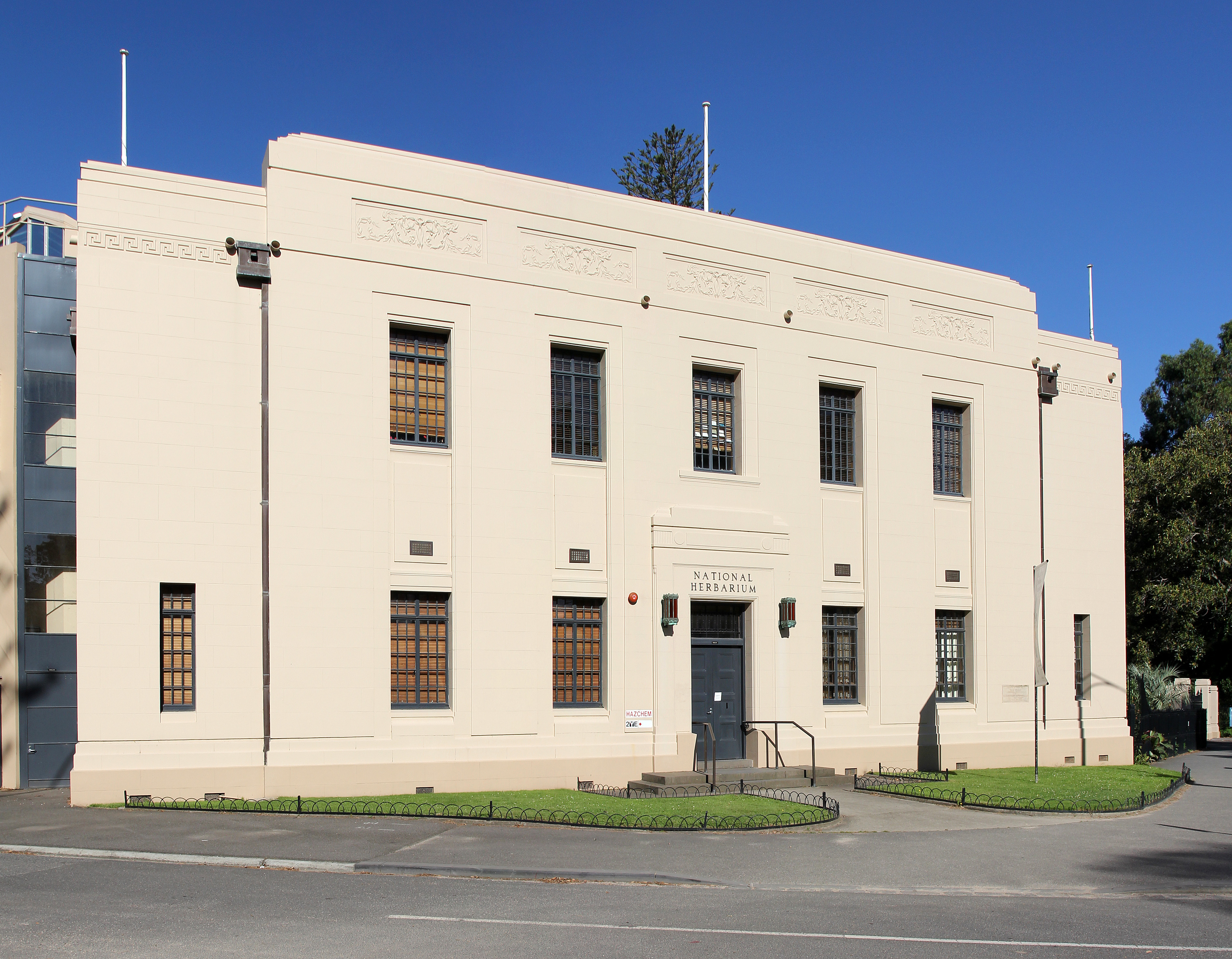
The National Herbarium Victoria, home to the State Botanical Collection

The State Botanical Collection of Victoria, usually referred to simply as the "State Botanical Collection", at the National Herbarium of Victoria at the Royal Botanic Gardens Victoria is the single largest herbarium collection in Australia and wider Oceania.

The collection is divided into the Specimen Collection, which includes 1.5 million preserved plants, algae and fungi, and the Library, Archive and Botanical Art Collection. It is housed in the National Herbarium of Victoria, located at Royal Botanic Gardens Victoria's Melbourne site.

== See also ==
- National Herbarium of Victoria
- Royal Botanic Gardens Victoria
