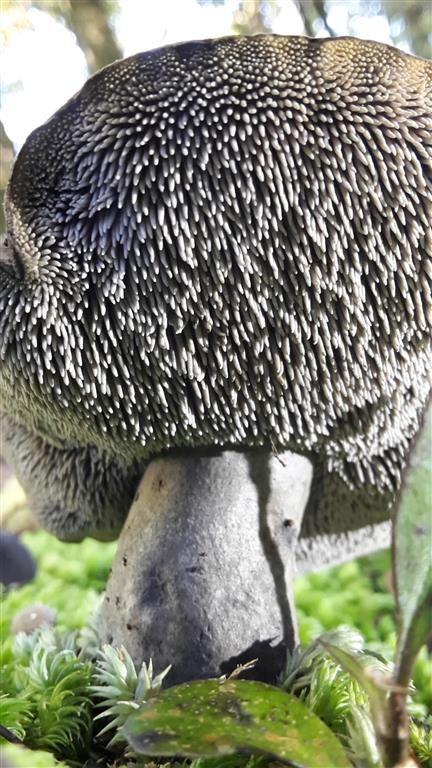

Scientific classification
- Kingdom: Fungi
- Division: Basidiomycota
- Class: Agaricomycetes
- Order: Thelephorales
- Family: Bankeraceae
- Genus: Sarcodon
- Species: S. thwaitesii

Binomial name
- Sarcodon thwaitesii (Berk. & Broome) Maas Geest. (1964)

Synonyms
- Hydnum thwaitesii Berk. & Broome (1873); Phaeodon thwaitesii (Berk. & Broome) Henn. (1898)

= Sarcodon thwaitesii =

Species of fungus

Sarcodon thwaitesii is a species of tooth fungus in the family Bankeraceae. It is found in Asia and Europe, where it fruits on the ground in mixed forest.

== Taxonomy ==
The fungus was first described in 1873 by Miles Berkeley and Christopher Edmund Broome as Hydnum thwaitesii, from collections made in Sri Lanka. Paul Christoph Hennings moved it to the now-defunct genus Phaeodon in 1898. Dutch mycologist Rudolph Arnold Maas Geesteranus transferred it to the genus Sarcodon in 1964, noting "To judge from the hyphal structure and the spore characters, this is a true Sarcodon".

The specific epithet thwaitesii honors English botanist and entomologist George Henry Kendrick Thwaites, who was superintendent of the botanical gardens at Peradeniya, Sri Lanka.

Maas Geesteranus placed S. thwaitesii in the section Virescentes, along with S. atroviridis and S. conchyliatus. In all of these species, the flesh dries to a deep olive green color.

S. thwaitesii is similar morphologically to the American and Asian species Sarcodon atroviridis and Australasian species Neosarcodon carbonarius. Australasian specimens in past publications and databases have been identified as S. thwaitesii, but these are misidentifications and are better attributed to N. carbonarius or Hydnellum nothofagacearum.

== Description ==
The fruit bodies of Sarcodon thwaitesii have flattened, depressed, or rounded caps measuring 2.5–4.5 cm (1.0–1.8 in) in diameter. Initially pale pink in color, they change to pale reddish-brown, and ultimately to blackish-brown. The flesh, roughly the same color as the cap, has a bitter taste. The stipe is centrally attached to the cap, and measure 4–5 cm (1.6–2.0 in) long by 0.7–1 cm (0.3–0.4 in) at the top. The spines on the cap underside are at first purple or purple brown, drying to blackish brown in age, and measure 2–4 mm. Spores are brown in mass; microscopically, they are roughly spherical, covered with moderate sized growths (tubercules), and measure 6–8 by 6–7 μm.

== Habitat and distribution ==
Sarcodon thwaitesii fruits on the ground in mixed forest. It is found in Asia and Europe.
