= Louisa Isabella Chaulk Baudinet =

Australian botanical collector

- Born: 7 April 1825; London
- Died: 13 February 1901 (aged 75); Hobart
- Parents: William Chaulk (later Baudinet) (father); Augusta Louisa née Baudinet (mother)

Louisa Isabella Chaulk Baudinet, also known as Lucy Baudinet or Miss Baudinet (7 April 1825 – 13 February 1901) was an Australian botanical collector.

== Life ==
Chaulk Baudinet was born on 7 April 1825 in London to William Chaulk (later Baudinet) (c.1799–1865), and Augusta Louisa née Baudinet (1805–1873). She was the second of twelve children in the family. In 1829, the family migrated to Western Australia, and in 1831 to Tasmania. In 1838–1847, Baudinet's father was the first lighthouse keeper on Bruny Island, and in 1848–1865, on Deal Island in the Kent Group. After the death of her parents, Baudinet lived with her siblings and never married.

Chaulk Baudinet collected specimens on Swan Island, where she lived with a brother who was lighthouse keeper there in 1869, and at Cape Portland and Clarke Island, 1883–1885. Her collections, approximately 114, have been lodged mainly at MEL, with others at HO and NSW. Swedish botanist Jacob Agardh identified Baudinet's algal specimens for Ferdinand von Mueller.

Chaulk Baudinet died on 13 February 1901 in Hobart, Tasmania at the New Town Charitable Institution of senilis.
