= Telopea (journal) =

- Discipline: Botany
- Language: English

Publication details
- History: 1975–present
- Publisher: National Herbarium of New South Wales, Royal Botanic Gardens & Domain Trust (Australia)
- Frequency: Biannually

Standard abbreviations
- ISO 4: Telopea

Links
- Journal homepage

Telopea is a fully open-access, online, peer-reviewed scientific journal that rapidly publishes original research on plant systematics, with broad content that covers Australia and the Asia-Pacific region. The journal was established in 1975 and is published by the National Herbarium of New South Wales, Royal Botanic Gardens & Domain Trust. As from Volume 9, part 1, 2000, full text of papers is available electronically in pdf format. It is named for the genus Telopea, commonly known as waratahs.

The forerunner of Telopea was Contributions from the New South Wales National Herbarium which was first published in July 1939 as Volume 1(1). Publication was suspended between 1941 and resumed in 1948 with the publication of Volume 1(4). The last edition was Volume 4(8) in 1973.
