= Sarcodon conchyliatus =

Scientific classification
- Domain: Eukaryota
- Kingdom: Fungi
- Division: Basidiomycota
- Class: Agaricomycetes
- Order: Thelephorales
- Family: Bankeraceae
- Genus: Sarcodon
- Species: S. conchyliatus

Binomial name
- Sarcodon conchyliatus Maas Geest. (1971)

Species of fungus

Sarcodon conchyliatus is a species of tooth fungus in the family Bankeraceae. Found in Malaysia, it was described as new to science in 1971 by Dutch mycologist Rudolph Arnold Maas Geesteranus. The fruit bodies have finely tomentose caps that are dull ochraceous, greyish or brownish, and typically have drab to purplish tinges. The spines on the cap underside are not decurrent on the stipe. Maas Geesteranus placed the fungus in the section Virescentes, along with S. atroviridis and S. thwaitesii, all species with flesh that dries to a deep olive green color.
