= Tom May (mycologist) =

Australian mycologist

Thomas (Tom) William May
- Education: Monash University
- Scientific career
- Fields: Mycology
- Workplaces: National Herbarium of Victoria, University of Melbourne
- Thesis: A taxonomic study of the Australian species of Laccaria (1991)
- Author abbrev. (botany): T.W.May

Thomas William May is a mycologist at the National Herbarium of Victoria where he specialises in the taxonomy and ecology of Australian macrofungi.

== Biography ==
May completed his undergraduate studies at the University of Melbourne and completed a PhD at Monash University in 1991 focusing on the fungal genus Laccaria.

He is most notable for the comprehensive bibliographical lists of all Australian fungi published thus far; Volume 2A, published in 1997, and Volume 2B, published in 2003.. May is the originator of Fungimap, an Australia-wide citizen-science mapping fungal mapping scheme based on observations of 100 easily identified macrofungi. May is the coordinator of the fungi component of the Australian National Species List. May was awarded the 2014 Australian Natural History Medallion. In 2023 May was awarded the Nancy T. Burbidge Medal from the Australasian Systematic Botany Society.

May has appeared in documentary films including The Giants and Follow the Rain and has published over 100 refereed articles as well as contributing extensively to non-refereed publications. May has appeared as an expert witness, including during the Leongatha mushroom murders in 2025.

== Mycological collections ==
Specimens collected by May are primarily held in the National Herbarium of Victoria, Royal Botanic Gardens Victoria, with smaller collections at the Tasmanian Museum and Art Gallery, National Herbarium of New South Wales and elsewhere in Australia.

== See also ==
- Category:Taxa named by Tom May (mycologist)
- Fungi of Australia
- List of mycologists
