= National Herbarium of Victoria =

Australian herbaria and scientific institution in Victoria

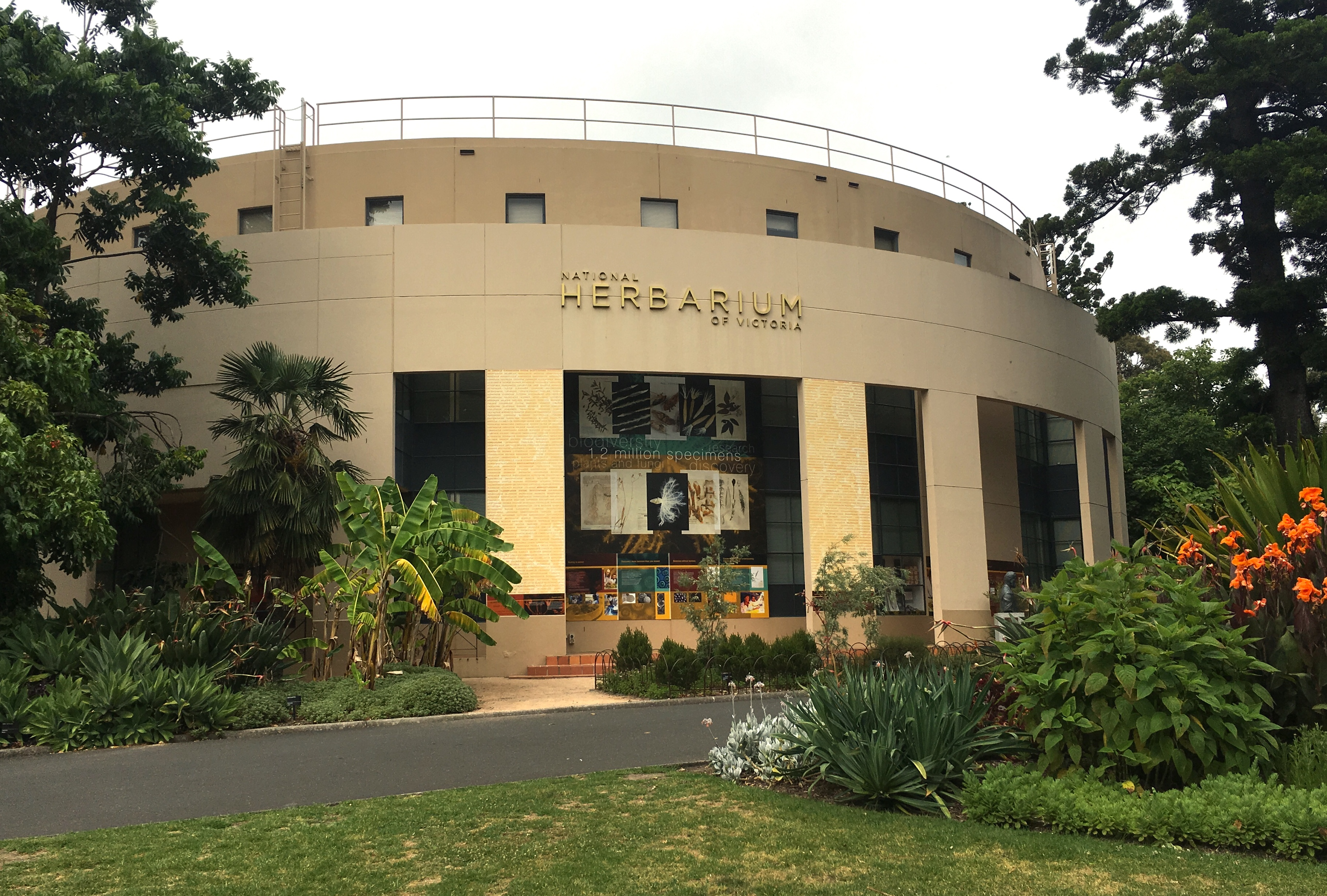
- The façade; an extension to the original building
- Established: 1853
- Address: Dallas Brooks Dr & Birdwood Avenue, Melbourne VIC 3004
- Location: Melbourne, Victoria, Australia
- Coordinates: 37.8309°S 144.9770°E
- Interactive map of National Herbarium of Victoria
- Website: National Herbarium of Victoria

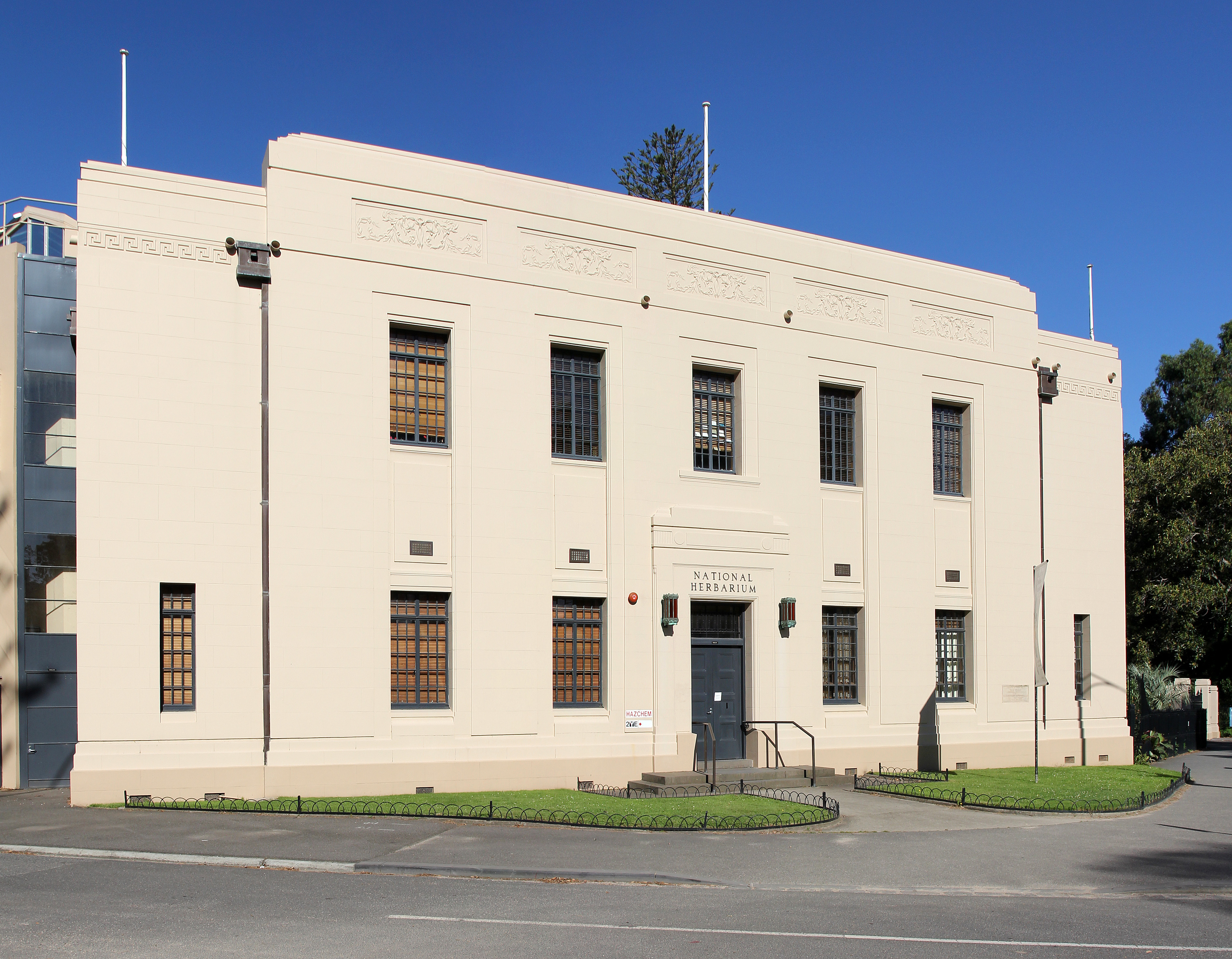
Reverse; showing the original architecture

The National Herbarium of Victoria (Index Herbariorum code: MEL) is one of Australia's earliest herbaria and the oldest scientific institution in Victoria. Its 1.56 million specimens of preserved plants, fungi and algae—collectively known as the State Botanical Collection of Victoria—comprise the largest herbarium collection in Australia and Oceania.

The collection includes scientifically and historically significant collections gathered by Joseph Banks and Daniel Solander during the voyage of HMS Endeavour in 1770, as well as 2,000 specimens collected by Robert Brown during Flinders' circumnavigation of Australia (1801–1805), and three collections made by Darwin during the Voyage of the Beagle to South America, Australia, and the Pacific. The herbarium was established in 1853 by Ferdinand von Mueller, the Government Botanist for Victoria, and is situated within the Royal Botanic Gardens, Melbourne. The present building was constructed in 1934 through a donation from philanthropist Sir Macpherson Robertson. It, along with a 1989 extension, houses the entire collection of 1.5 million plant and fungal specimens. The Herbarium's botanic library is an important source for the history of Australian botany, and has contributed some 124 volumes (of the 1212 volumes contributed by Australia Institutions) to the digital Biodiversity Heritage Library.

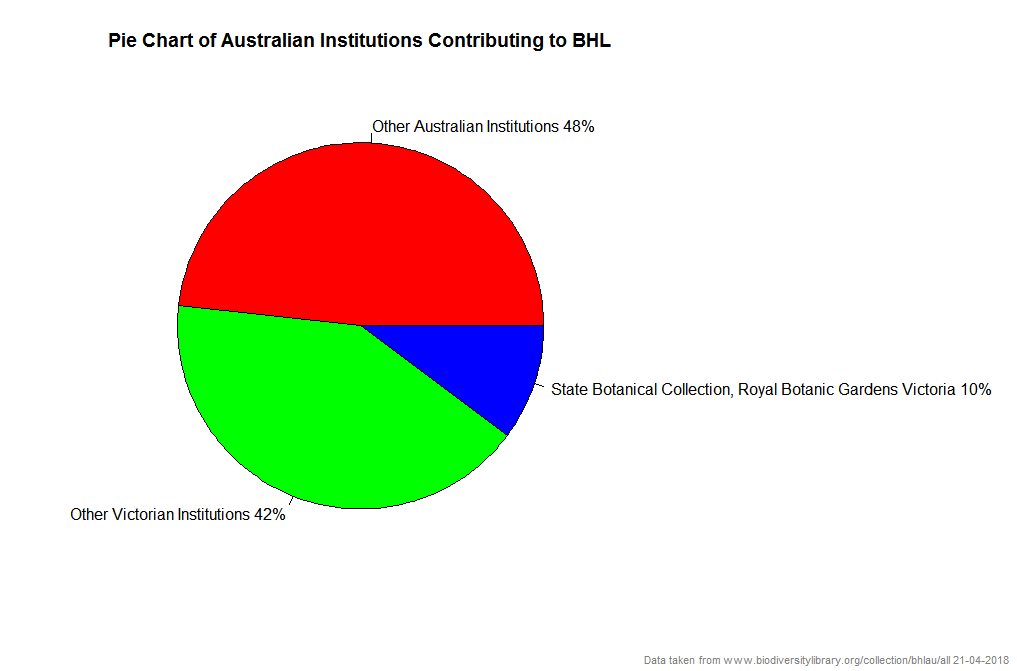
Piechart of Australian contributions to the Biodiversity Heritage Library

The herbarium is also a partner in the Australasian Virtual Herbarium project, thereby making all of its collection data available to anyone to use. The herbarium also publishes an online key together with descriptions of plants found in Victoria via VicFlora.

== Collections ==
Over half of the existing collection was acquired by Mueller. The herbarium includes the following collections:

- Otto Sonder herbarium
- Fern collections
- Bryophyte collections
- Algae collections
- Lichen collections
- Fungi collections
- Botany of the Burke and Wills expedition

== See also ==
- Louisa Isabella Chaulk Baudinet, 1869, collected specimens; collection includes 97 specimens in MELISR database
- Amelia Bunbury, who collected specimens as Miss A. Pries or A.M. Pries.
- Muelleria (journal), a peer-reviewed botanical journal published by the Royal Botanic Gardens Melbourne
- National Herbarium of New South Wales
- List of herbaria
- Australasian Virtual Herbarium
- Fungimap
- Past and present staff (not already mentioned)
  - Helen Aston
  - Marco Duretto
  - Tim Entwisle
  - Rex Filson
  - Don Forman
  - Jim Grimes
  - Teresa Lebel
  - Tom May
  - Josephine Milne
  - Alexander Morrison
  - Dan Murphy
  - Alastair Robinson
  - Jim Willis
  - Frank Udovicic
