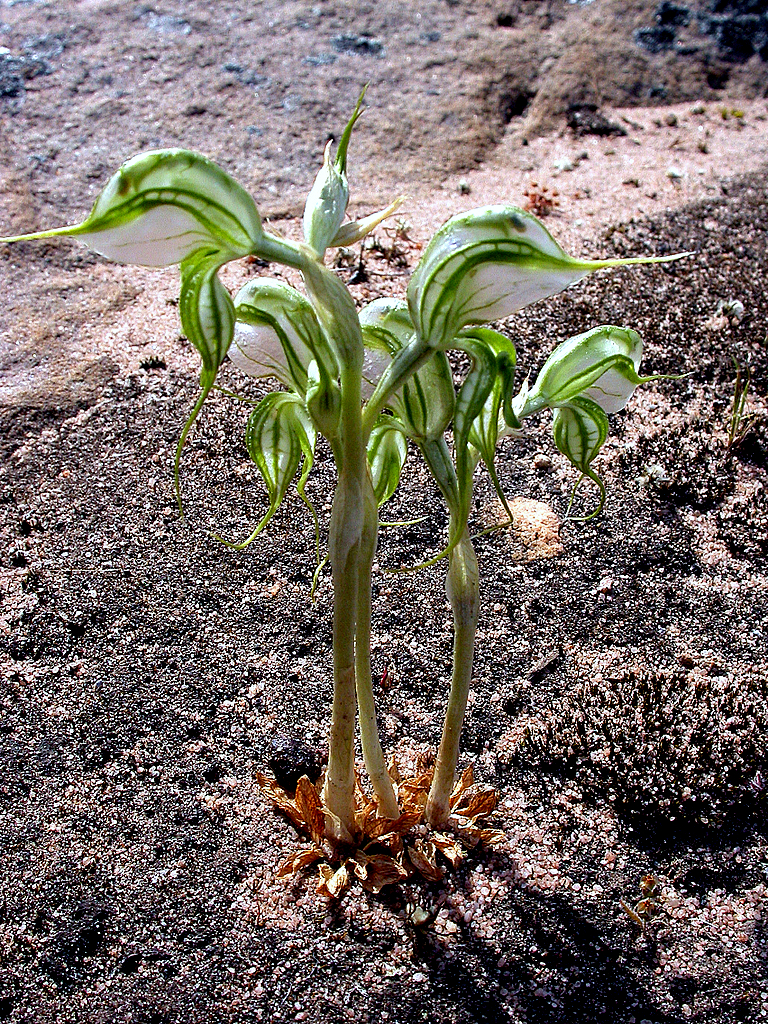
- Pterostylis planulata growing in the Grampians National Park

Scientific classification
- Kingdom: Plantae
- Clade: Tracheophytes
- Clade: Angiosperms
- Clade: Monocots
- Order: Asparagales
- Family: Orchidaceae
- Subfamily: Orchidoideae
- Tribe: Cranichideae
- Genus: Pterostylis
- Species: P. planulata

Binomial name
- Pterostylis planulata D.L.Jones & M.A.Clem.

Synonyms
- Oligochaetochilus planulatus (David L. Jones & M.A.Clem.) D.L.Jones & M.A.Clem.

= Pterostylis planulata =

Flat rustyhood

Species of orchid

Pterostylis planulata, commonly known as the flat rustyhood, is a plant in the orchid family Orchidaceae and is endemic to Victoria. It has a rosette of leaves at its base and up to seven translucent flowers with green stripes. The flowers have a thin, dark green, insect-like labellum.

== Description ==
Pterostylis planulata, is a terrestrial, perennial, deciduous, herb with an underground tuber. It has a rosette of between five and eight leaves at the base of the flowering spike, each leaf 18–300 mm (0.7–10 in) long and 5–8 mm (0.2–0.3 in) wide. The leaves are often withered by the time of flowering. Up to seven translucent flowers with green stripes and 30–35 mm (1.2–1.4 in) long, 9–11 mm (0.35–0.43 in) wide are borne on a flowering spike 100–200 mm (4–8 in) tall. Three or four stem leaves are wrapped around the flowering spike. The dorsal sepal and petals are joined to form a hood called the "galea" over the column with the dorsal sepal having a thread-like tip 20–30 mm (0.8–1 in) long. The lateral sepals are slightly wider than the galea, densely hairy on their outer edges and suddenly taper to a thread-like tip, 20–35 mm (0.8–1 in). The tips of the lateral sepals are more or less parallel to each other and about 10 mm (0.4 in) apart. The labellum is thin, green and insect-like, about 6–7 mm (0.2–0.3 in) long and 3 mm (0.1 in) wide. The "head" end has two long bristles and there are 18 to 24 shorter bristles on the side. Flowering occurs from October to November.

== Taxonomy and naming ==
Pterostylis planulata was first formally described in 1983 by David Jones & Mark Clements and the description was published in Muelleria. The type specimen was collected in the northern end of the Grampians National Park. The specific epithet (planulata) is derived from the Latin word planus meaning "level" or "flat" referring to the almost flat, sometimes shallowly dished, lateral sepals.

== Distribution and habitat ==
The flat rustyhood is only known from the northern part of the Grampians National Park where it grows in shallow soil on rock ledges.
