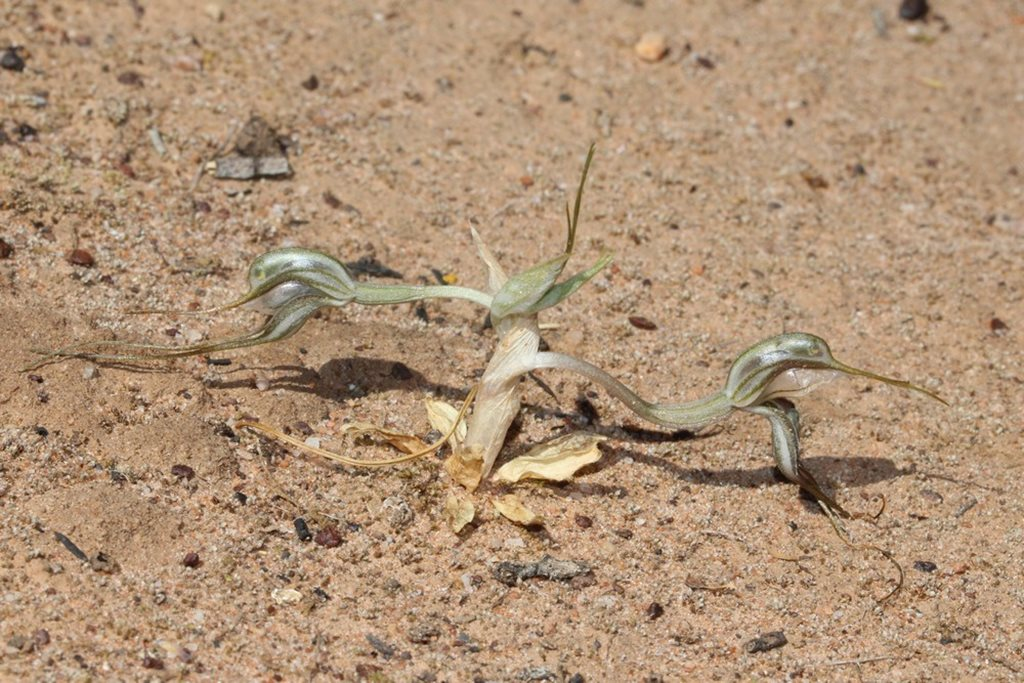
- Pterostylis despectans growing near Inglewood in Victoria

Conservation status
- Endangered (EPBC Act)

Scientific classification
- Kingdom: Plantae
- Clade: Tracheophytes
- Clade: Angiosperms
- Clade: Monocots
- Order: Asparagales
- Family: Orchidaceae
- Subfamily: Orchidoideae
- Tribe: Cranichideae
- Genus: Pterostylis
- Species: P. despectans

Binomial name
- Pterostylis despectans Nicholls

Synonyms
- Oligochaetochilus despectans (Nicholls) David L. Jones & M.A.Clem.

= Pterostylis despectans =

Lowly rustyhood

Species of orchid

Pterostylis despectans, commonly known as the lowly rustyhood, is a plant in the orchid family Orchidaceae and is endemic to south-eastern Australia. It has a rosette of leaves at its base and up to six flowers on long stalks, branching off a short flowering stem. The flowers have an insect-like labellum and often touch the ground.

== Description ==
Pterostylis despectans, is a terrestrial, perennial, deciduous, herb with an underground tuber. It has a rosette of between six and ten leaves at the base of the flowering spike, each leaf 10–20 mm (0.4–0.8 in) long and 6–8 mm (0.2–0.3 in) wide. The leaves are often withered by the time of flowering. Up to six translucent flowers with green and brown markings and 30–38 mm (1.2–1.5 in) long, 6–8 mm (0.2–0.3 in) wide are borne on a flowering spike 30–50 mm (1–2 in) tall. Each flower is carried on the end of a long, thin stalk. Three or four papery bracts are wrapped around the flowering spike. The dorsal sepal and petals are joined to form a hood called the "galea" over the column with the dorsal sepal having a thread-like tip 10–13 mm (0.4–0.5 in) long. The lateral sepals are slightly wider than the galea and often touch the ground. They are shallowly dished, densely hairy on their outer edges and suddenly taper to a thread-like tip, 20–26 mm (0.8–1 in). The labellum is brown to green, thin and insect-like, about 5 mm (0.2 in) long and 2 mm (0.08 in) wide. The "head" end has two long bristles and there are up to 10 to 16 shorter bristles on the side. Flowering occurs from November to December.

== Taxonomy and naming ==
The lowly greenhood was first formally described in 1950 by William Nicholls who gave it the name Pterostylis rufa var. despectans and published the description in The Victorian Naturalist. The type specimen was collected near Maryborough in Victoria. In 1989, Mark Clements and David Jones raised it to species status.

== Distribution and habitat ==
Pterostylis despectans has a restricted distribution in each of the three Australian states in which it occurs. In New South Wales there is only a single population growing in grassland near Moama in the Riverina district. In Victoria it grows in forest near Maryborough, grassland near Bendigo and woodland near Horsham and in South Australia in parts of the Northern Lofty flora region.

== Conservation ==
Pterostylis despectans is classified as "endangered" under the Victorian Government Flora and Fauna Guarantee Act 1988, "critically endangered" in New South Wales, "endangered" in South Australia and as "endangered" (EN) under the Australian Government Environment Protection and Biodiversity Conservation Act 1999 (EPBC Act). The main threats to this species are habitat loss and fragmentation, invasive species and low reproduction rates.
