= Fungimap =

Australian non-profit, citizen-science organization

Fungimap Inc is an Australian non-profit, citizen-science organization founded in 1996 dedicated to raising the profile of Australia's fungal diversity. Fungimap's focus is on macrofungi in the natural environment. Fungimap headquarters is located in the National Herbarium of Victoria, Royal Botanic Gardens Melbourne, South Yarra, Victoria.

== Citizen science ==
Fungimap maintains the National Australian Fungimap Database (NAFD) containing over 120,000 records and 6,500 images of fungi from over 700 contributors nationwide. This valuable resource is used for research, conservation, and policy purposes and has been provided to the Australian National Heritage Assessment Tool (ANHAT), state and Commonwealth environment agencies, and the Atlas of Living Australia. Anyone can contribute fungi records to Fungimap; submitting a fungal record often follows the below criteria:

• Species name

• Location: using Lat/Long or GPS and a text description

• Date seen

• Photographic details: file name of the relevant photo and the permission you would like to grant to Fungimap in relation to the image

• Habitat, e.g. garden, rainforest, eucalypt woodland, nearest tree

• Substrate (what is it growing on) e.g. tree trunk (species?)/ fallen log (species?)/ on soil/ other significant details.

There is some controversy over whether these details should be hidden in some instances, for instance the location of poisonous deathcap mushrooms.

== Organisational structure ==
Fungimap is a not-for-profit organization with an independent Management Committee with representation from across Australia. Committee members have diverse backgrounds and interests including field mycology, fungi recording and inventory, fungi photography and painting, education, conservation, taxonomy and ecology. Several subcommittees assist with carrying out the aims of the organization, as set out in the Constitution and elaborated in the Strategic Plan. There are subcommittees for Data and Images, Conservation and Biodiversity and Funding and Promotion, as well as the organizing committees for the particular Conferences and Festivals that are being planned. Fungimap has a staff of two part-time Coordinators, a team of office volunteers, and a wide network of people submitting data and images. The Management Committee is elected annually at the AGM.

== Publications ==
Fungi Down Under - The Fungimap guide to Australian fungi:

Written by Pat and Ed Grey, and edited by Leon Costermans.
