= Hydnellum nothofagacearum =

Scientific classification
- Domain: Eukaryota
- Kingdom: Fungi
- Division: Basidiomycota
- Class: Agaricomycetes
- Order: Thelephorales
- Family: Bankeraceae
- Genus: Hydnellum
- Species: H. nothofagacearum

Binomial name
- Hydnellum nothofagacearum Douch, J.A. Cooper

Species of fungus

Hydnellum nothofagacearum is a species of mushroom in the family Bankeraceae. It was described by James K. Douch and Jerry A. Cooper in 2024. The specific epithet refers to Nothofagaceae, with which these fungi are associated. The type locality is in Nelson Lakes National Park, New Zealand.

== See also ==
- Fungi of Australia
