= List of herbaria in Oceania =

Listed here are the 48 currently active herbaria in Oceania, organised by herbarium code, with institution name, location and collection sizes as per Index Herbariorum.

== List of active herbaria ==
=== Australia ===
Herbarium Code	Institution	Location	Collection Size
ACH	National Mycology Reference Centre	Adelaide, South Australia	2,000
AD	State Herbarium of South Australia	Adelaide, South Australia	1,040,000
BRI	Queensland Herbarium	Brisbane, Queensland	871,571
BRIP	Department of Agriculture and Fisheries	Brisbane, Queensland	100,000
CANB	Australian National Herbarium	Canberra, Australian Capital Territory	1,204,426
CFSHB	North Coast Regional Botanic Garden	Coffs Harbour, New South Wales	20,000
CNS	Australian Tropical Herbarium	Cairns, Queensland	195,000
DAR	NSW Plant Pathology and Mycology Herbarium	Orange, New South Wales	115,000
DMHN	The University of Newcastle	Newcastle, New South Wales	10,644
DNA	Department for Environment and Water	Palmerston, Northern Territory	255,000
DNAP	Department of Primary Industry and Resources	Darwin, Northern Territory	4,000
ECU	Edith Cowan University	Joondalup, Western Australia	10,000
ERBG	Eurobodalla Regional Botanic Garden	Batemans Bay, New South Wales	14,261
GAUBA	Australian National University	Canberra, Australian Capital Territory	25,000
HO	Tasmanian Museum and Art Gallery	Sandy Bay, Tasmania	300,000
IBRG	Macquarie University Indigenous Bioresources Research Group	Sydney, New South Wales	125
JCT	James Cook University	Townsville, Queensland	25,800
KPBG	Kings Park and Botanic Garden	West Perth, Western Australia	25,000
LTB	La Trobe University	Bundoora, Victoria	25,000
MEL	Royal Botanic Gardens Victoria	South Yarra, Victoria	1,562,000
MELU	University of Melbourne Herbarium	Parkville, Victoria	150,000
MQU	Macquarie University	North Ryde, New South Wales	13,000
MURU	Murdoch University	Murdoch, Western Australia	7,000
NE	University of New England	Armidale, New South Wales	65,000
NSW	Royal Botanic Gardens & Domain Trust	Sydney, New South Wales	1,425,000
NT	Department of Environment and Natural Resources	Alice Springs, Northern Territory	65,000
PERTH	Western Australian Herbarium	Kensington, Western Australia	807,340
PHARM	Southern Cross University	Lismore, New South Wales	6,500
SYD	University of Sydney	Sydney, New South Wales	60,000
UNSW	University of New South Wales	Kensington, New South Wales	61,000
UWA	University of Western Australia	Crawley, Western Australia	13,000
VPRI	Victoria State Government	Bundoora, Victoria	42,000
WAC	Department of Primary Industry and Regional Development	South Perth, Western Australia	5,800
WOLL	University of Wollongong	Wollongong, New South Wales	7000

=== New Zealand ===
Herbarium Code	Institution	Location	Collection Size
AK	Auckland War Memorial Museum	Auckland	350,000
CANU	University of Canterbury	Christchurch	41,000
CHBG	Christchurch Botanic Gardens	Christchurch	8,500
CHR	Allan Herbarium	Lincoln	700,000
LINC	Lincoln University	Lincoln	10,000
MPN	Massey University	Palmerston North	30,500
NZFRI	Scion (Crown Research Institute)	Rotorua	37,000
NZFRIM	Scion (Crown Research Institute) — Fungi	Bay of Plenty	11,000
OTA	Otago Regional Herbarium (University of Otago)	Dunedin	70,000
PDD	Manaaki Whenua – Landcare Research (Fungi)	Auckland	104,000
UNITEC	Unitec Institute of Technology	Auckland	10,120
WAIK	University of Waikato	Hamilton	17,000
WELT	Museum of New Zealand Te Papa Tongarewa	Wellington	293,000

=== Elsewhere in Oceania ===
Herbarium Code	Institution	Location	Collection Size
SUVA	South Pacific Regional Herbarium and Biodiversity Centre (University of the South Pacific)	Suva, Fiji	40,000

== Oceania's largest herbaria based on collection size ==
The ten largest herbaria in Oceania, based on total collection size are:

Collection Size	Herbarium Code	Institution	Location
1,562,000	MEL	Royal Botanic Gardens Victoria	South Yarra, Victoria
1,425,000	NSW	Royal Botanic Gardens & Domain Trust	Sydney, New South Wales
1,204,426	CANB	Australian National Herbarium	Canberra, Australian Capital Territory
1,040,000	AD	State Herbarium of South Australia	Adelaide, South Australia
871,571	BRI	Queensland Herbarium	Brisbane, Queensland
807,340	PERTH	Western Australian Herbarium	Kensington, Western Australia
700,000	CHR	Allan Herbarium	Lincoln, New Zealand
350,000	AK	Auckland War Memorial Museum	Auckland, New Zealand
300,000	HO	Tasmanian Museum and Art Gallery	Sandy Bay, Tasmania
293,000	WELT	Museum of New Zealand Te Papa Tongarewa	Wellington, New Zealand
