= Tasmanian Herbarium =

The Tasmanian Herbarium is a herbarium in Hobart, Tasmania, Australia. Its Index Herbariorum code is HO.

It is a part of the Tasmanian Museum and Art Gallery. The earliest plant samples in the herbarium's collection date from early European exploration of Tasmania. These include specimens collected in the 1792 voyage to the island of Bruny d'Entrecasteaux and those collected by Robert Brown in the first decade of the 19th Century.

Since 1977 the herbarium has been located on the Sandy Bay campus of the University of Tasmania.
