= State Herbarium of South Australia =

Herbarium in Adelaide, South Australia

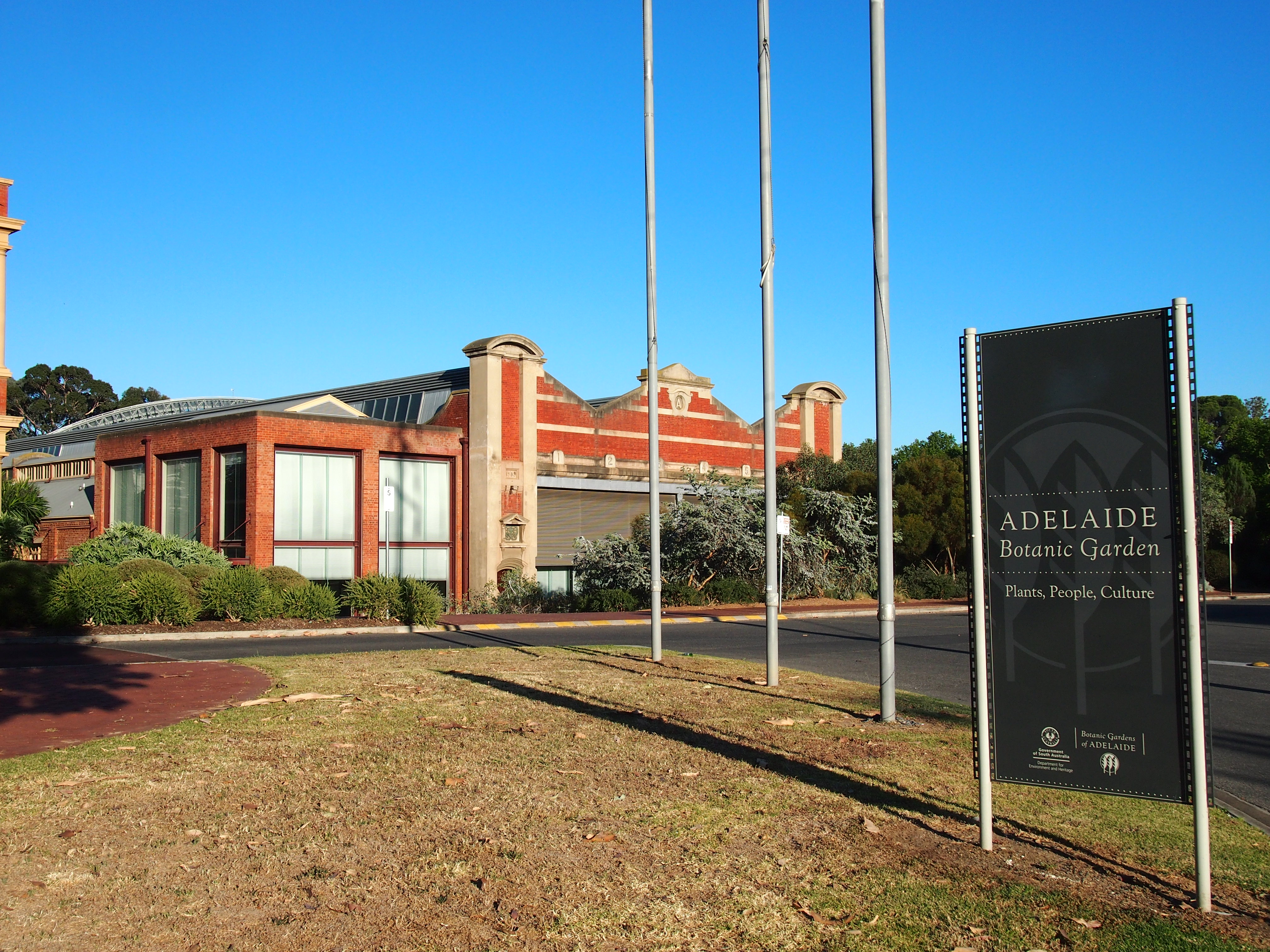
- Established: 1954
- Address: Hackney Rd, Adelaide SA 5000
- Location: Adelaide, South Australia, Australia
- Coordinates: 34.9174°S 138.6139°E
- Website: State Herbarium of South Australia

The State Herbarium of South Australia, sometimes called the South Australian Herbarium, and having the herbarium code, AD, is located in Adelaide, South Australia. It is one of several State and Commonwealth herbaria in Australia. The Department for Environment and Water is the state agency which is responsible for the Herbarium, but the Board of the Botanic Gardens and State Herbarium (established by an Act of Parliament, most recently the Botanic Gardens and State Herbarium Act 1978) is charged with its establishment and maintenance.

The Herbarium publishes for the electronic Flora of South Australia FloraSA and the Census of South Australian plants, algae and fungi. It also publishes the journal, Swainsona (formerly Journal of the Adelaide Botanic Gardens).

== History ==
In 1954 the State Herbarium of South Australia was founded as part of the Adelaide Botanic Garden. The first flora collection of the state was produced by Richard Schomburgk (1811–1891) in 1875.

The State Herbarium's collections include collections of Ralph Tate, John McConnell Black (via the South Australian Museum), the moss herbarium of Professor David Guthrie Catcheside (1907–1994), and the collections of the Field Naturalists Society of South Australia.

Since 2000 the Herbarium has been located in the historic Tram Barn A building adjacent to the Adelaide Botanic Garden's Bicentennial Conservatory on Hackney Road, Adelaide.

In late 2011 the Herbarium was due to list its one millionth specimen, possibly a new species.

Also in 2011, the Herbarium produced an online version of the Flora of South Australia, 5th edition.
