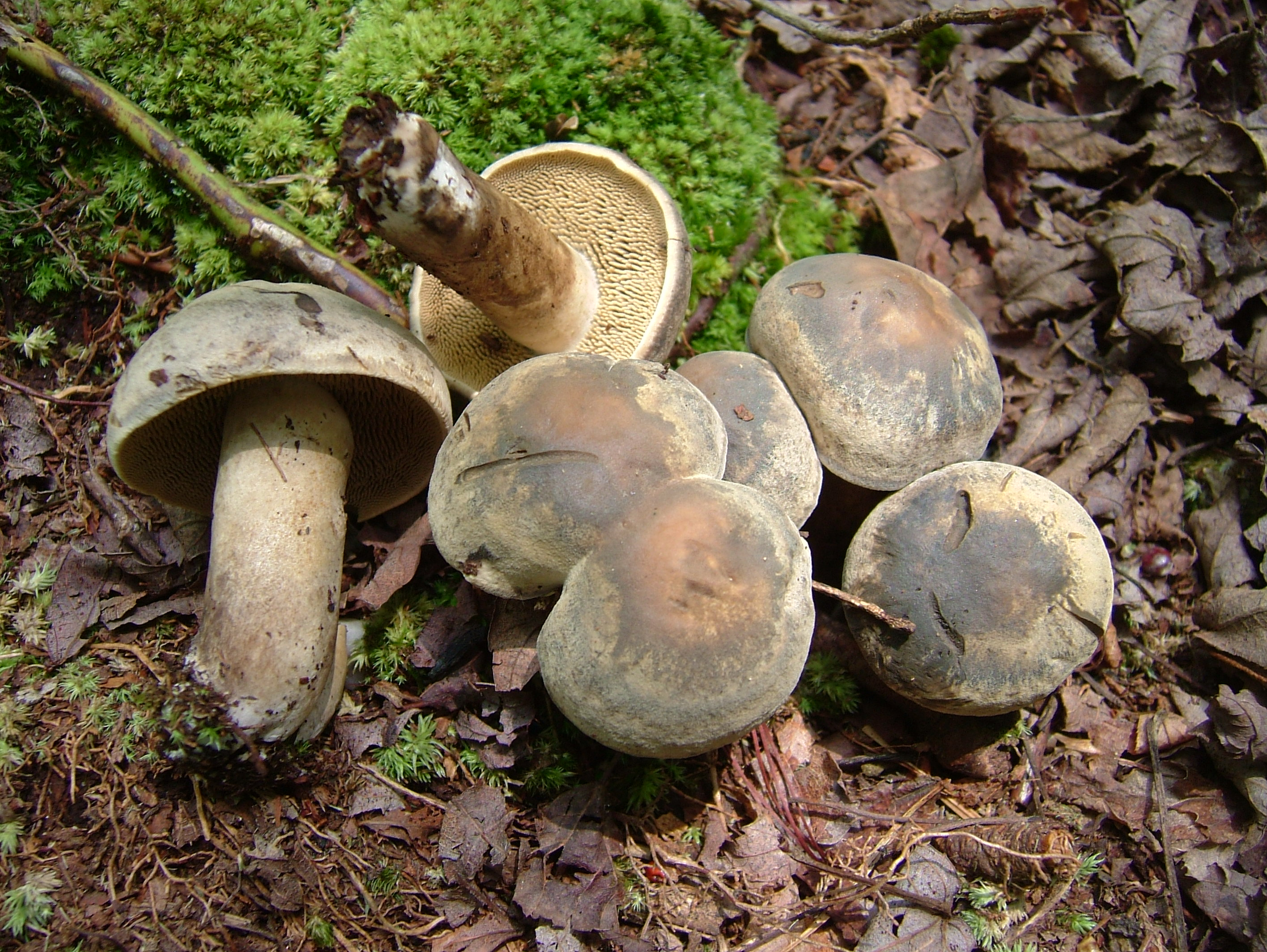

Scientific classification
- Domain: Eukaryota
- Kingdom: Fungi
- Division: Basidiomycota
- Class: Agaricomycetes
- Order: Thelephorales
- Family: Bankeraceae
- Genus: Sarcodon
- Species: S. atroviridis

Binomial name
- Sarcodon atroviridis (Morgan) Banker (1906)

Synonyms
- Hydnum atroviride Morgan (1895); Hydnum atroviride Morgan (1895); Phaeodon atroviridis (Morgan) Earle (1901); Hydnum blackfordiae Peck [as 'blackfordae'] (1906); Sarcodon blackfordiae (Peck) Banker (1906); Sarcodon fumosus Banker (1913); Hydnum fumosus (Banker) Sacc. (1925); Hydnum bambusinum R.E.D.Baker & W.T.Dale (1951); Hydnum fumosum (Banker) Pouzar (1956); Sarcodon bambusinus (R.E.D.Baker & W.T.Dale) Maas Geest. (1974)

= Sarcodon atroviridis =

Species of fungus

Sarcodon atroviridis is a species of fungus in the family Bankeraceae found in North America and Asia. It was originally described in 1895 as Hydnum atroviride by Andrew Price Morgan. Howard James Banker transferred it to Sarcodon in 1906. The fungus is known from Asia and North America; in 2015 it was reported from Brazil. The specific epithet atroviridis means "blackish green". While not explicitly known to be poisonous, it is considered of poor edibility.
