= Royal Botanic Gardens Victoria =

Botanic gardens in Victoria, Australia

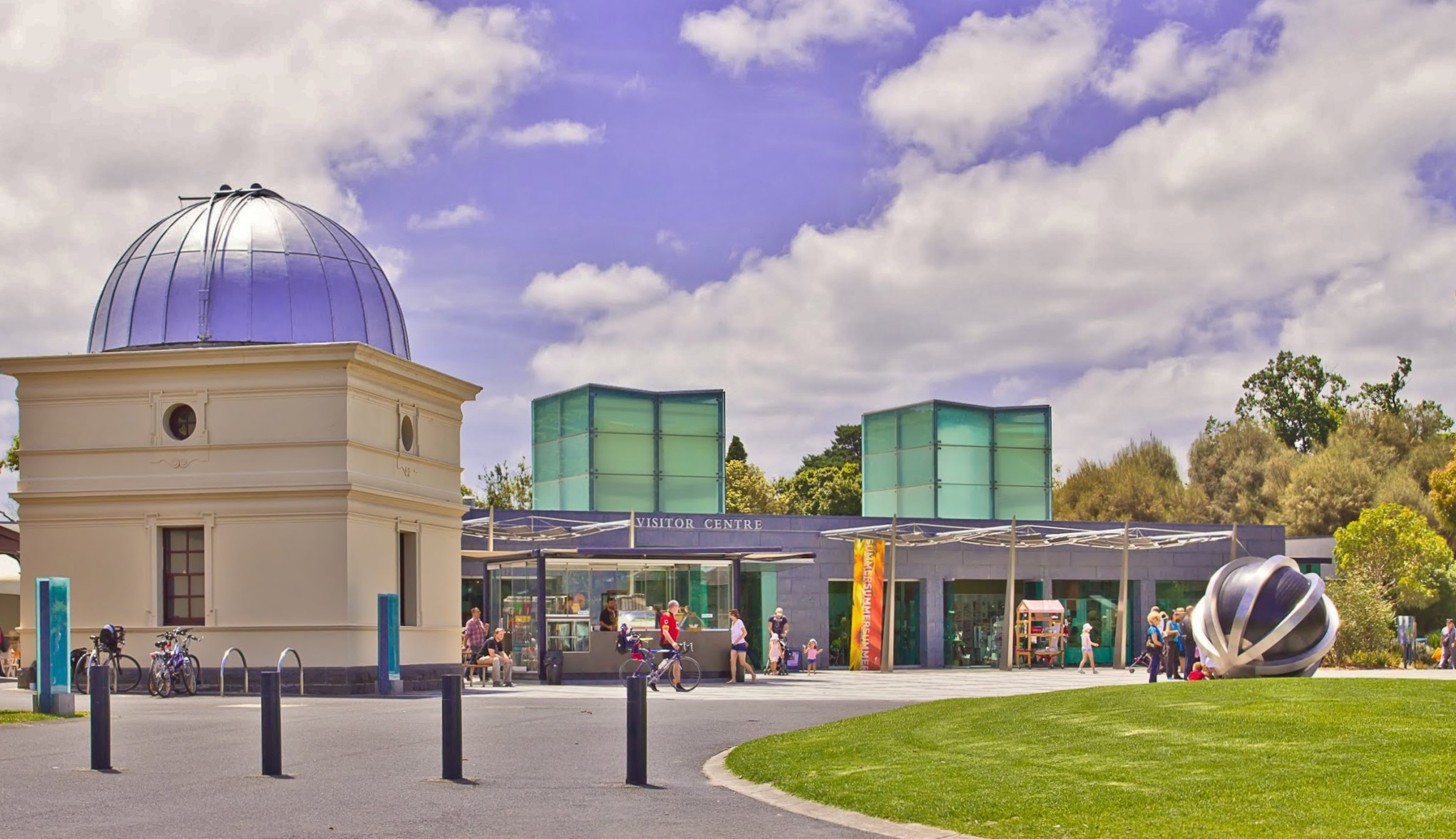
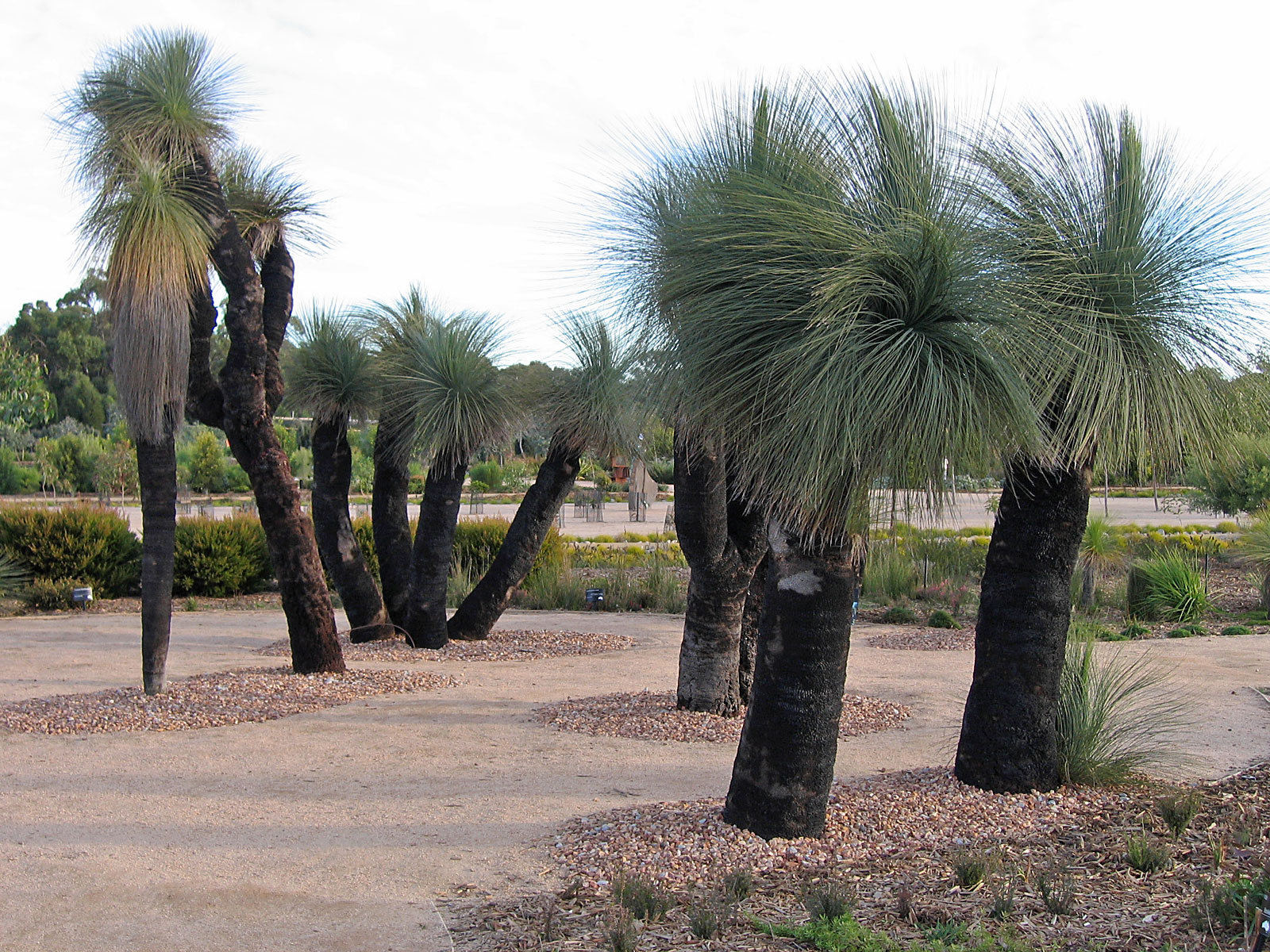
- Main (Observatory) entrance, Melbourne gardens, 2011 Kingia australis, Cranbourne gardens
- Interactive map of Royal Botanic Gardens Victoria
- Type: Botanical gardens
- Location: Melbourne, Victoria, Australia: Melbourne city: Birdwood Avenue; Cranbourne: Ballarto Road; South Yarra: IPFCG
- Coordinates: 37°50′00″S 144°58′49″E (Melbourne); 38.129°S 145.282°E (Cranbourne)
- Area: 401 ha (990 acres) (total): 38 ha (94 acres) (Melbourne); 363 ha (900 acres) (Cranbourne)
- Established: 1846; 180 years ago (Melbourne); 28 May 2006; 20 years ago (Cranbourne)
- Founder: Charles La Trobe
- Designer: Ferdinand von Mueller; William Guilfoyle
- Owner: Victorian Government (as crown land)
- Visitors: c. 2+ million
- Open: 7:30am to 5:30pm (Melbourne); 9:00am to 5:00pm (Cranbourne); (Daylight saving may extend closing)
- Status: Open; entry is free
- Vegetation: Australian native; lawns; non-native European gardens
- Public transit: Melbourne only: – Anzac; –; – 605 and 246
- Landmarks: National Herbarium of Victoria (1846); Craft Cottage (1850); Gardeners House (1854); Temple of the Winds (1901)
- Facilities: Information centre; gift shop; toilets; barbecues; shelter; cafes
- Website: rbg.vic.gov.au

Victorian Heritage Register
- Official name: Royal Botanic Gardens (Melbourne)
- Type: Registered place
- Designated: 20 August 1982
- Reference no.: H1459
- Category: Parks, Gardens and Trees; Landscape - Cultural
- Heritage overlay no.: HO402

Location of both gardens in Greater Metropolitan Melbourne

The Royal Botanic Gardens Victoria (RBGV) are botanic gardens across two sites—in the City of Melbourne and the Cranbourne gardens.

The 38-hectare (94-acre) Melbourne Gardens was founded in 1846 when land was reserved on the south side of the Yarra River for a new botanic garden. The gardens slope down to the river with trees, garden beds, lakes and lawns and displays almost 50,000 individual plants representing 8,500 different species, displayed in thirty living plant collections. The Royal Botanic Gardens, Melbourne site was added to the Victorian Heritage Register on 20 August 1982 due to its historical, architectural, scientific, aesthetic, and social significance.

The 363-hectare (897-acre) Cranbourne Gardens was established in 1970 when land was acquired by the Gardens in the suburb of Cranbourne, on Melbourne's south-eastern urban fringe for the purpose of establishing a garden dedicated to Australian plants. A generally wild site that is significant for biodiversity conservation, it opened to the public in 1989, where visitors can explore native bushland, heathlands, wetlands and woodlands. One of the features of Cranbourne is the Australian Garden, completed in 2012, which celebrates Australian landscapes and flora through the display of approximately 170,000 plants from 1,700 plant varieties. The Cranbourne gardens site is located approximately 45 kilometres (28 mi) south-east of the Melbourne city centre.

The Royal Botanic Gardens Victoria is home to the State Botanical Collection, which is housed in the National Herbarium of Victoria. The collection, which includes 1.5 million preserved plants, algae and fungi, represents the largest herbarium collection in Australia and wider Oceania. It also includes Australia's most comprehensive botanical library.

The gardens are governed under the Royal Botanic Gardens Act 1991 (No. 87 of 1991) by the Royal Botanic Gardens Board, who are responsible to the Victorian Minister for Environment.

== History ==
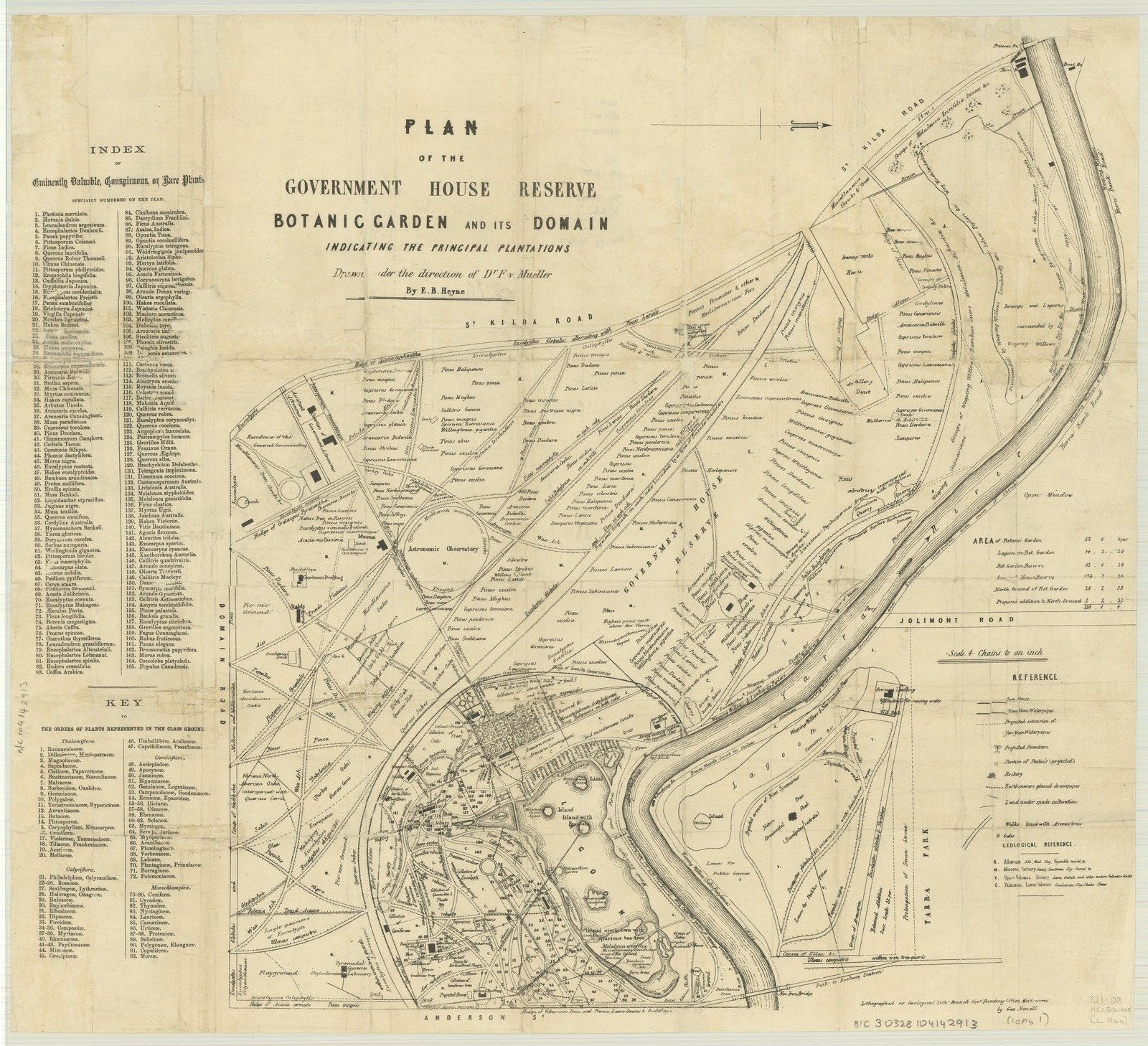
1869 plan of the Government House reserve, including the Melbourne gardens

In 1846 Charles La Trobe selected the site for the Royal Botanic Gardens from marshland and swamp, adjacent to Government House, Melbourne Observatory and the Kings Domain. Initially granted just 2 hectares (4.9 acres), the area was significantly enlarged in 1857, upon the appointment of Ferdinand von Mueller as the first permanent director, having previously served as the government botanist, where he created the National Herbarium of Victoria and brought in many plants. William Guilfoyle became Director in 1873 and changed the style of the Gardens to something more like the picturesque gardens that were around at that time. He added tropical and temperate plants. In 1877 Sir Edmund Barton, Australia's first Prime Minister and Jane Ross were married at the Royal Botanic Gardens.

At 6:30 p.m. on 23 January 1924, one of Australia’s first recorded mass shootings occurred at the Gardens, resulting in the deaths of four people. 30-year-old Norman Alfred List, armed with a newly purchased .44-caliber Marlin Model 1894 lever-action rifle, opened fired on strangers at random, killing four (Eugenie Strohhaker (39), Frederick William McIlwaine (75), Miriam Podbury (47), and John Moxham (37)) and wounding Marie Parry (42). Following a nine-day manhunt, List's body was discovered on 1 February 1924, in a creek at Pakenham. An investigation determined that he had committed suicide.

In June 2015 the gardens brought together the elements of the organisation under the name Royal Botanic Gardens Victoria, incorporating Melbourne Gardens, Cranbourne Gardens, the National Herbarium of Victoria and the Australian Research Centre for Urban Ecology.

== Horticulture ==
Living collections, or individual gardens, at the Melbourne site include: Aotearoa New Zealand, Araucariaceae, Australian Forest Walk, Australian Rare and Threatened Species, Cacti and Succulent, Camellia, Climate Ready Rose Collection, Cycad, Eucalypt, Fern Gully, Gardens House, Grey Garden, Guilfoyle's Volcano, Herb and Medicinal, The Ian Potter Foundation Children's Garden, Lower Yarra Rvver Habitat, North American Drylands, Palm, Perennial Border, Quercus, Southern Africa, Southern China, and Terrestrial Orchid Collection.

== Ecology ==
The gardens include a mixture of native and non-native vegetation which invariably hosts a diverse range of both native and non-native fauna. The gardens host over 10,000 floral species, the majority being non-native species. The gardens were the origin from which many introduced species spread throughout south-eastern Australia as seeds were traded between early European botanists in the mid-19th century, studying the Australian flora.

=== Native vegetation ===
From the establishment of the gardens in 1846, much of the native vegetation was removed as botanists such as Baron Von Mueller planted a range of species from around the world. While initially much of the native wetlands and swamplands in the gardens were left, around the turn of the 20th century these were re-landscaped to create the Ornamental Lake. Despite this, however, there are some large eucalypts remaining including the prominent Separation Tree, a 300-year-old river red gum, under which Victoria was declared a separate colony. In August 2010 the Separation Tree was attacked by vandals and then attacked again in 2013, by 2015 it was dead and removal of the canopy and branches commenced. The Royal Botanic Gardens, Cranbourne focus solely on Australian native plants.

=== Non-native traditional gardens ===
The Royal Botanic Gardens Melbourne were initially intended to be a horticultural exhibition for the public to enjoy, many seeds were traded between early European botanists such as Arthur and Von Mueller, who planted non-native species. The Queen and her grandfather, Dame Nellie Melba and Paderewski contributed plantings on occasions throughout the history of the gardens.

=== Plant science ===
Since its earliest days, the Royal Botanic Gardens has been involved in plant research and identification. This is now done primarily through the National Herbarium of Victoria, which is based at the Gardens. The Herbarium is also home to the State Botanical Collection, which includes over 1.5 million dried plant specimens, and an extensive collection of books, journals and artworks. Research findings are published in the journal Muelleria, which is a scientific representation of the work done in the Gardens in any one year. More recently, the Australian Research Centre for Urban Ecology has been established to look at plants that grow in urban environments specifically.

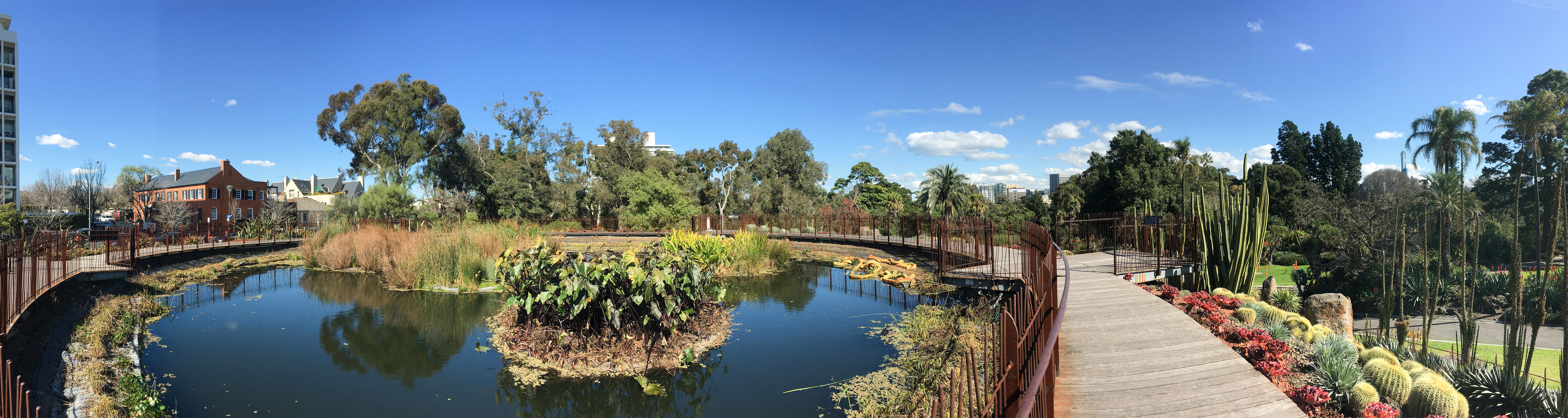
Guilfoyle's Volcano

== Ian Potter Foundation Children's Garden ==
The 5,000-square-metre (54,000 sq ft) Ian Potter Foundation Children's Garden is designed as a discovery area for children of all ages and abilities. The Ian Potter Children's Garden, named for the Ian Potter Foundation, is based in South Yarra, off the main site. This area is closed for two months of the year from the end of the Victorian July school holidays for rest and maintenance.

In 2004 or 2005 The Magic Pudding sculpture, by Louis Laumen, was unveiled in the garden. The concept for the garden was developed by Simon H. Warrender (son of Simon George Warrender and Pamela Warrender), who also commissioned the sculpture, through Committee for Melbourne's Future Focus Group, which was founded by Pamela. Simon Warrender announced the establishment of the annual prizes to be awarded by his Melbourne Prize Trust at the unveiling.

== The Tan ==
Outside the exterior fence of the Royal Botanic Gardens is a 3.8 km (2.4 mi) jogging loop known as the Tan Track or simply the Tan. It was built in the 1900s as a tanbark horse riding track; before later being converted for jogging and surfaced with a fine tan-coloured gravel, except along Anderson St which is paved. Clocks and distance markers were installed in 2011, and the track is the most well-known and well-used jogging track in Melbourne.

== Gallery ==
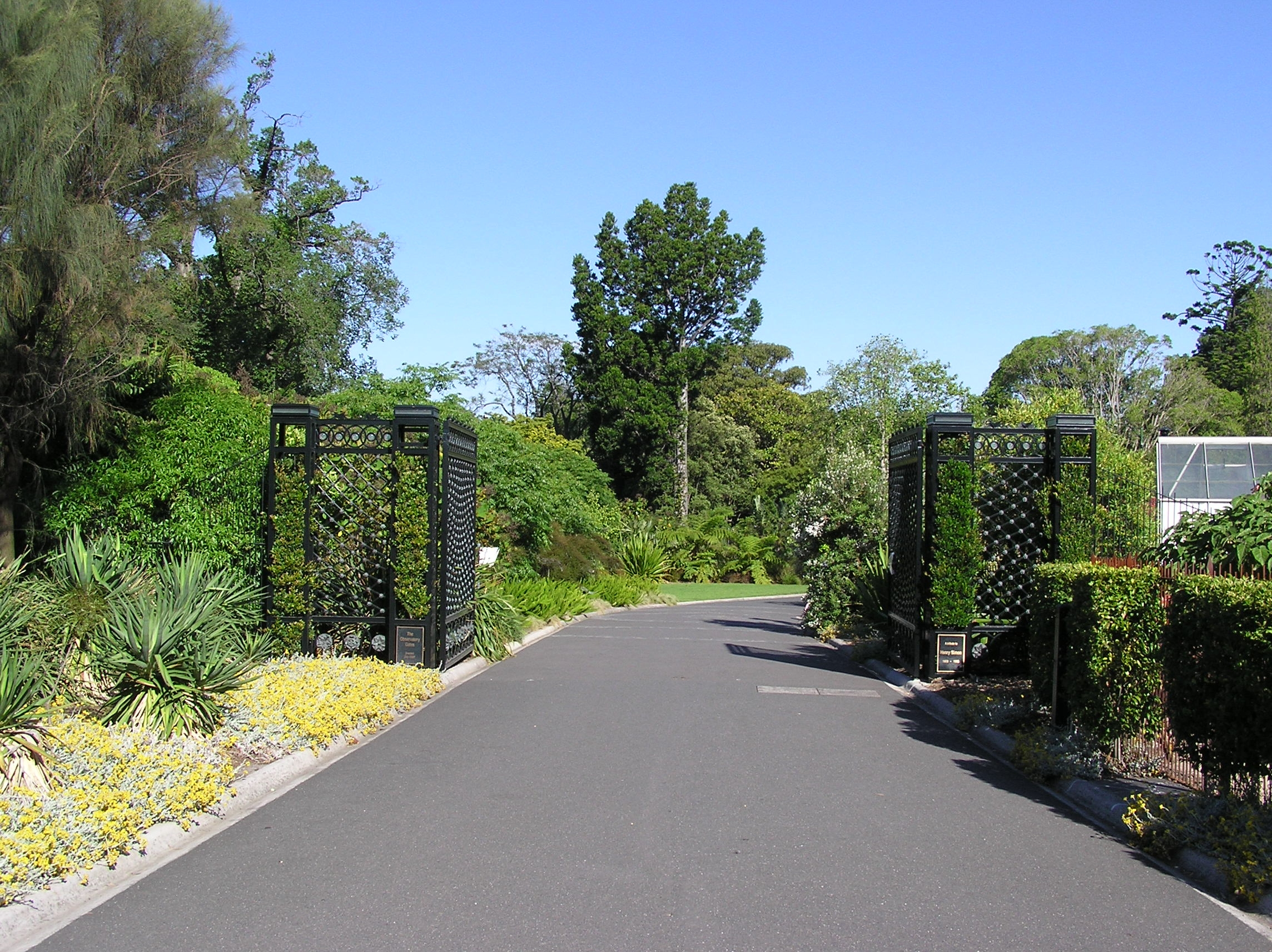
The main entrance gate

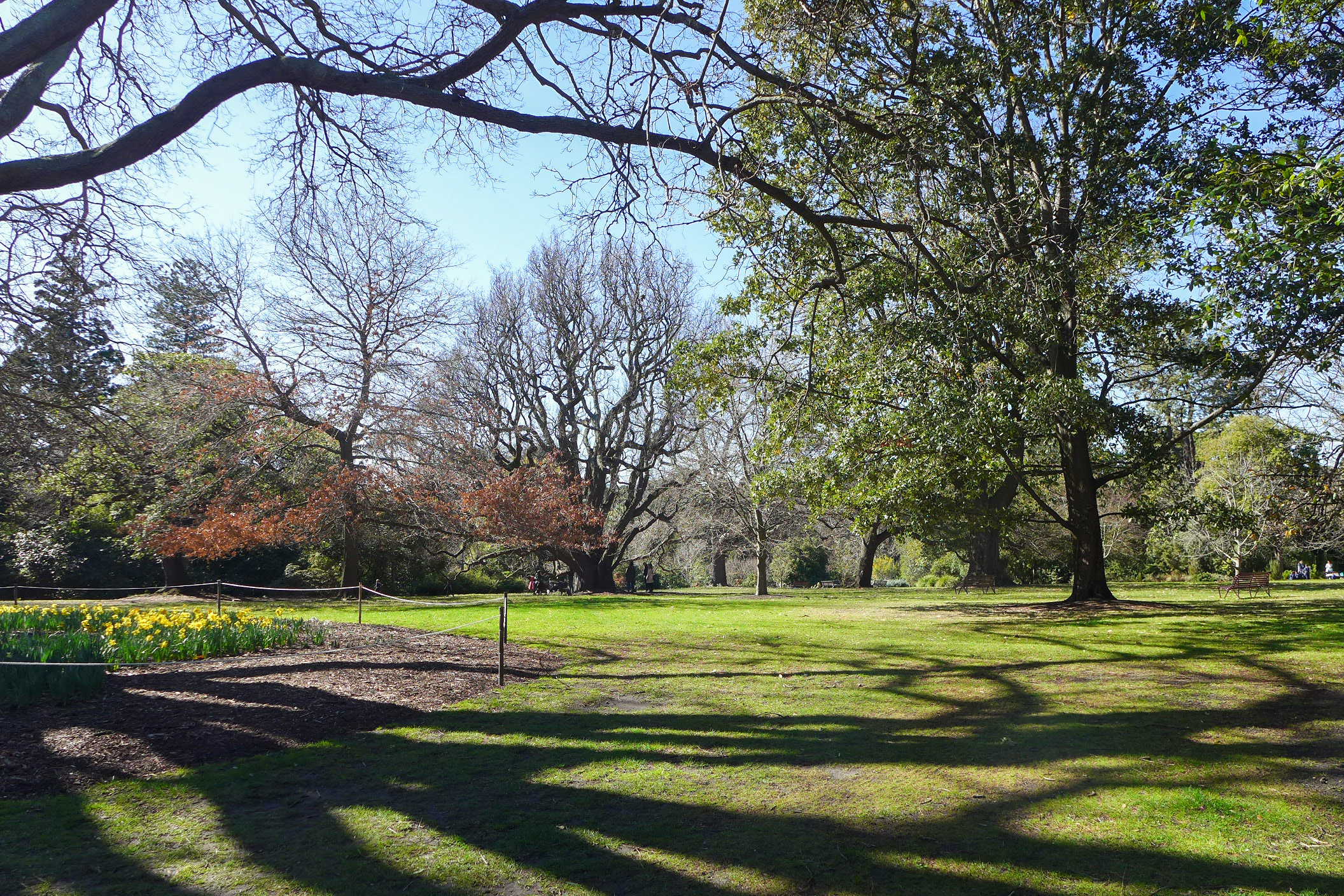
Oak lawn

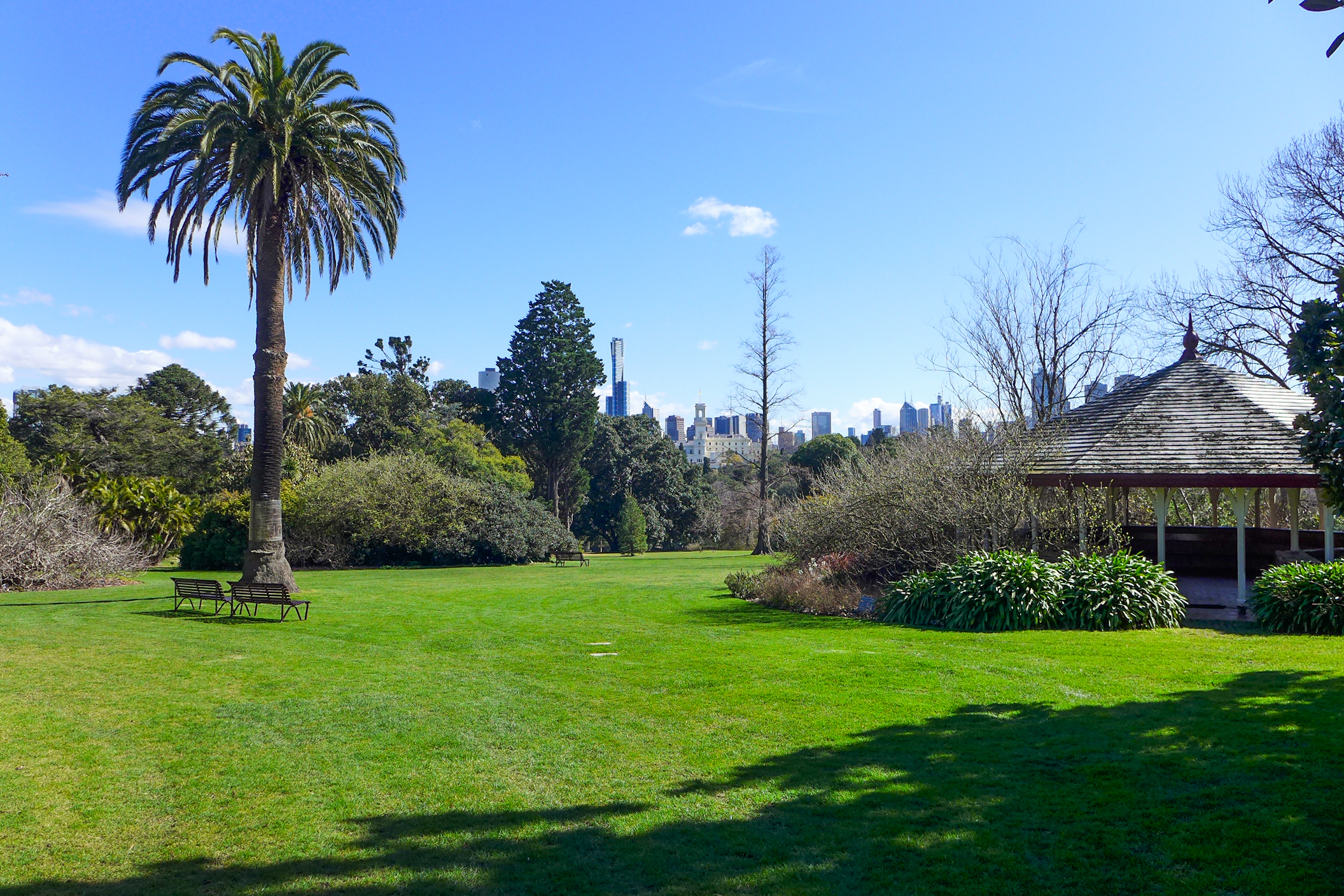
Eastern lawn

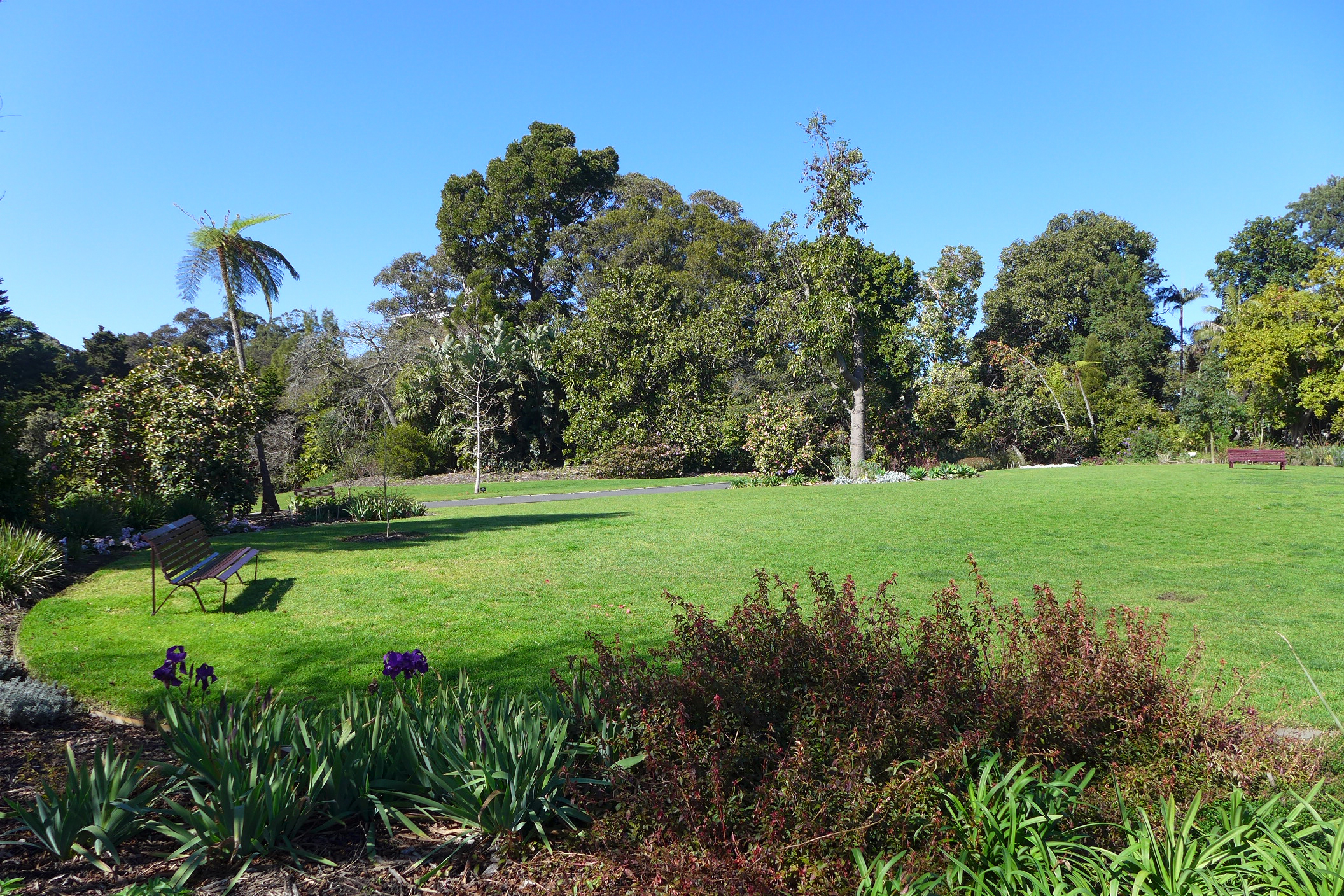
Southern lawn

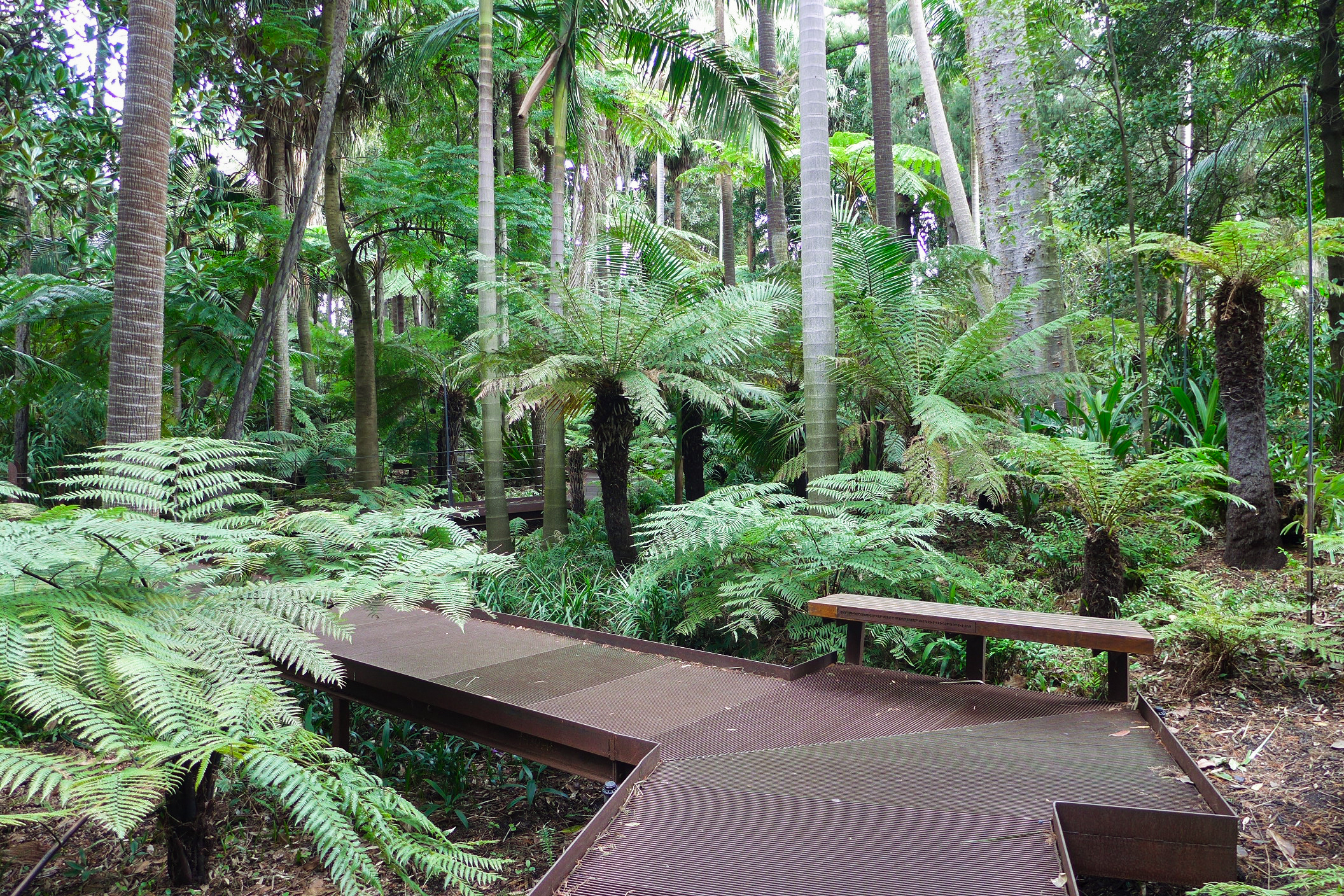
Fern gully

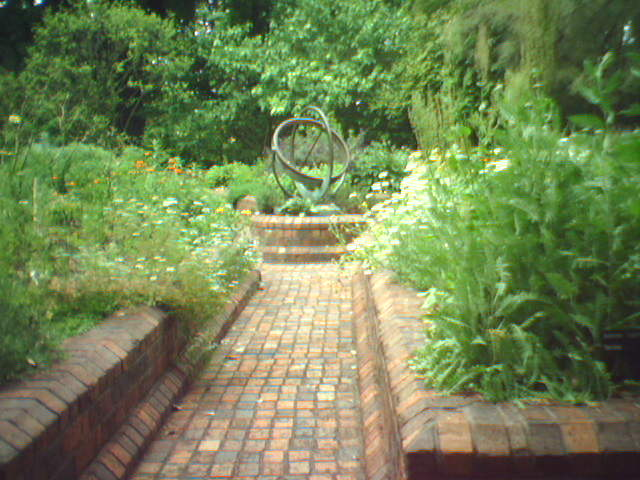
Herb garden

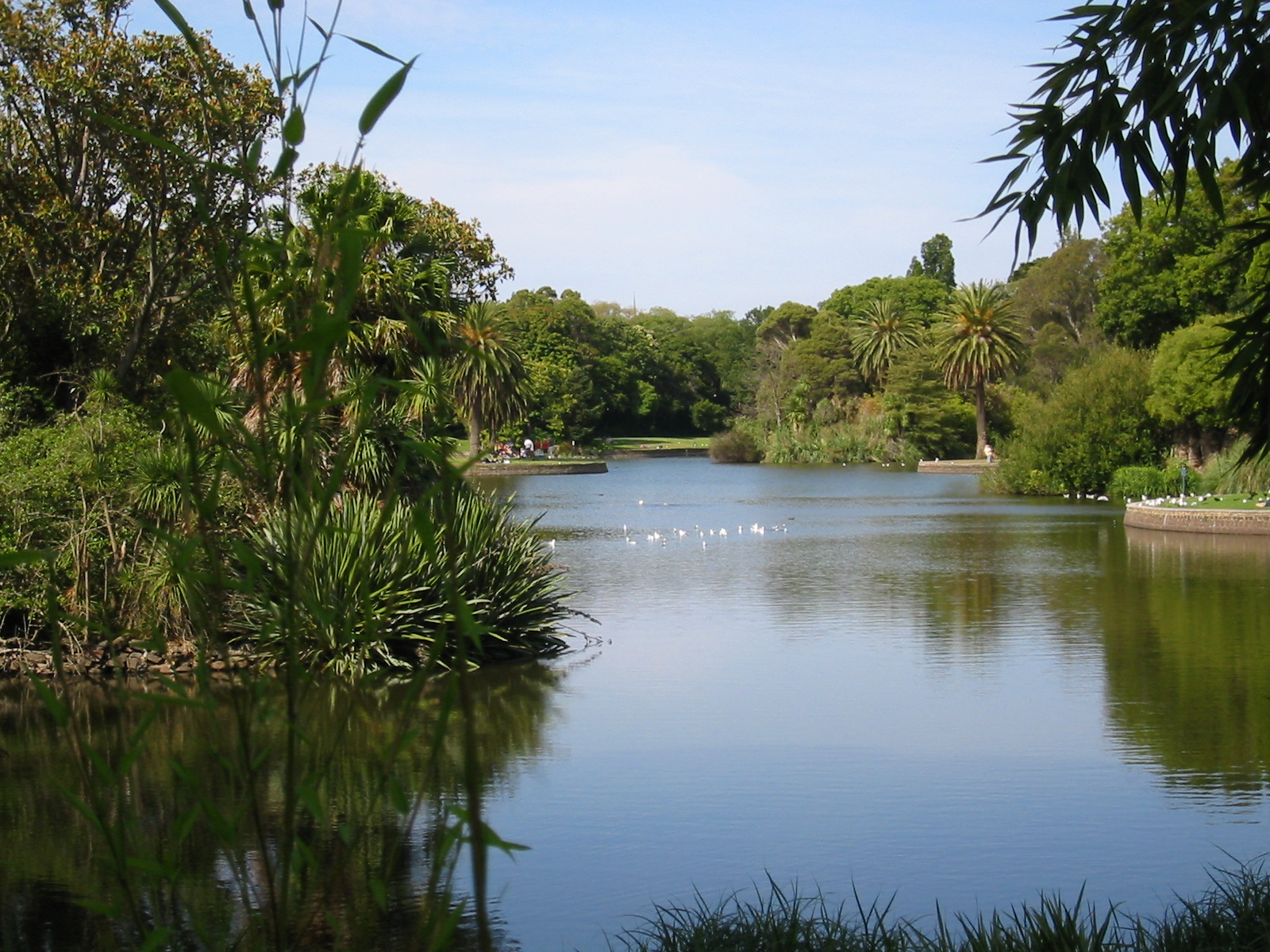
Ornamental lake

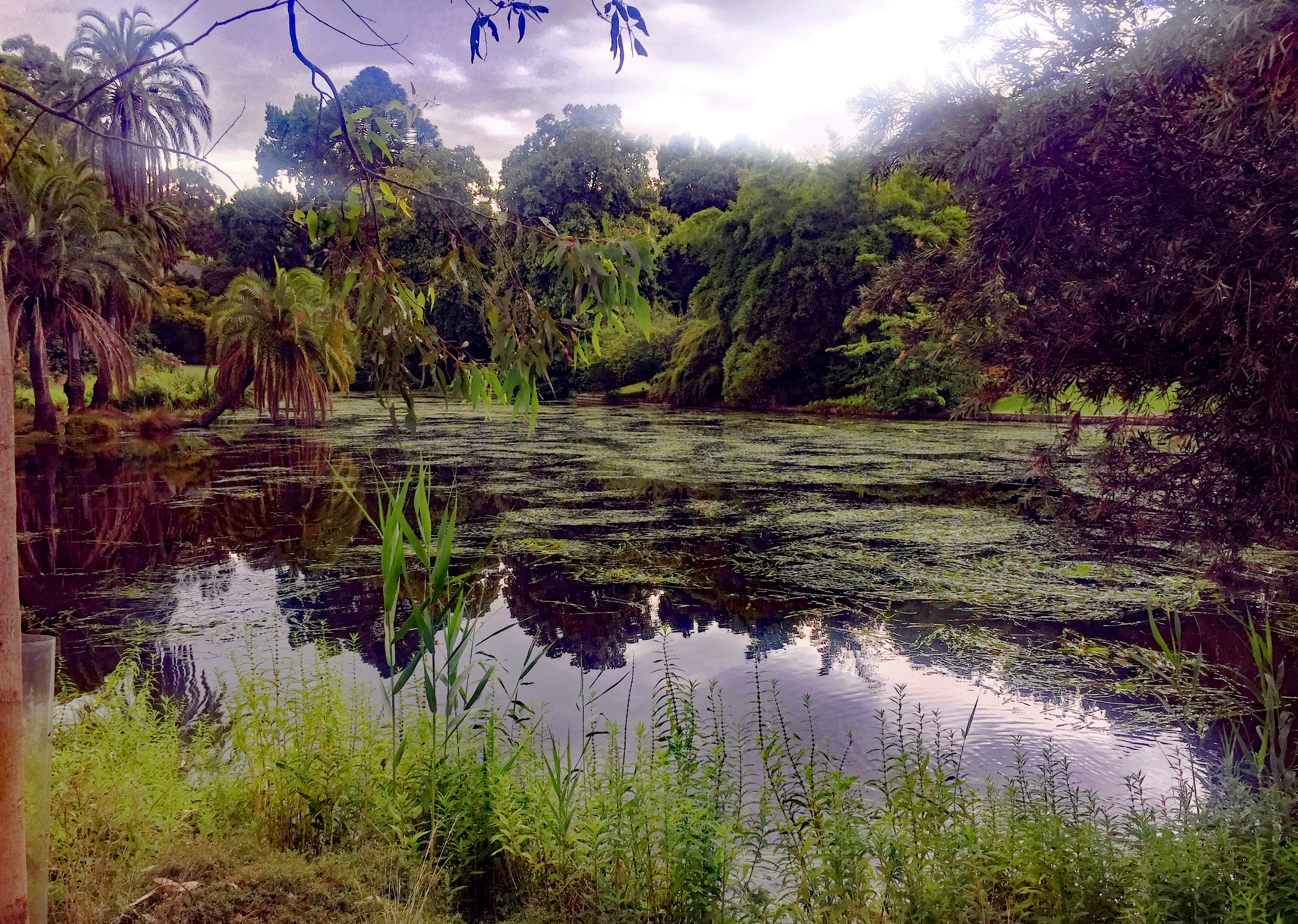
Ornamental Lake minutes before a thunderstorm

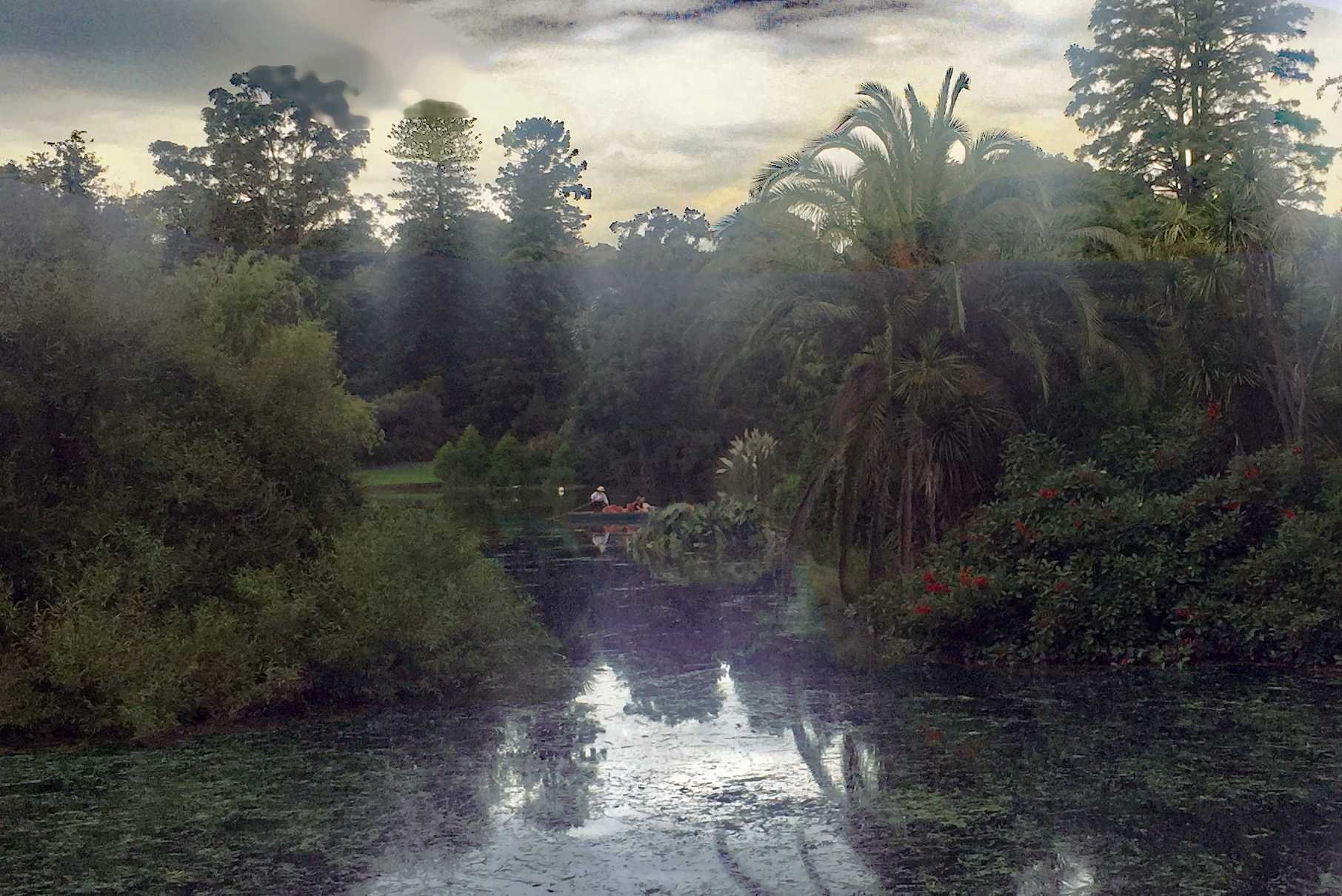
Punting on the lake at dusk, early autumn, 2020

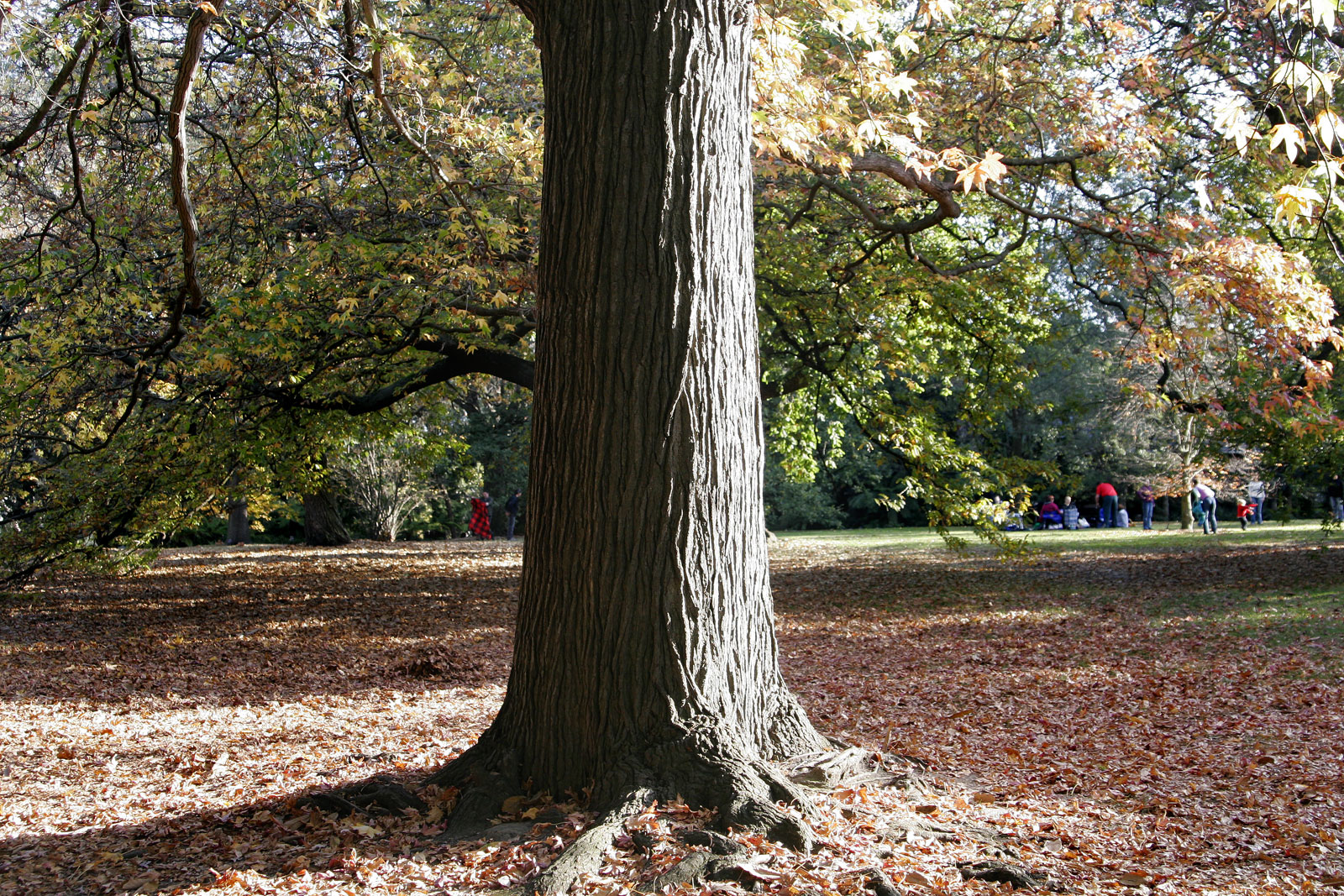
Autumn at the gardens

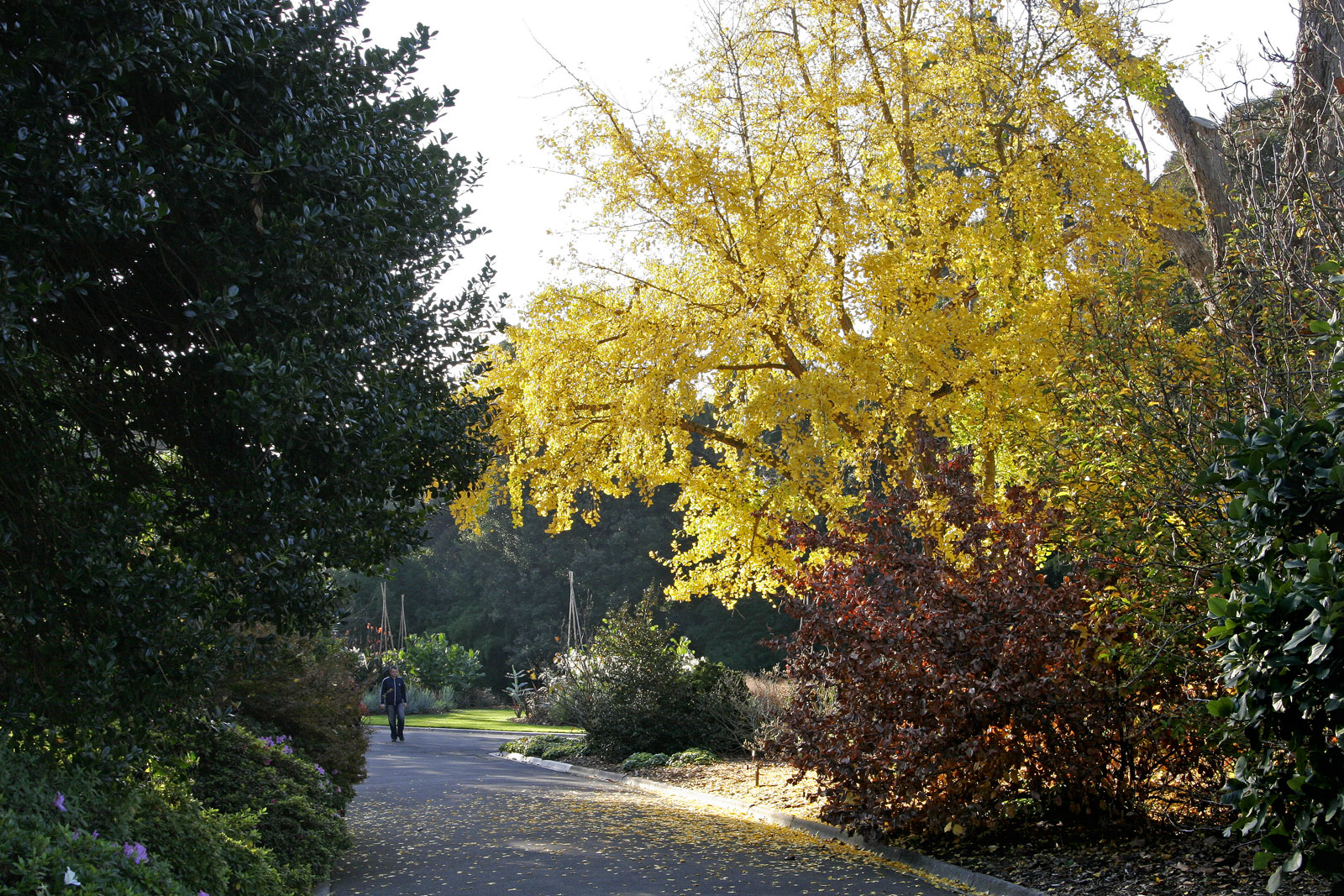
A section of the gardens in winter

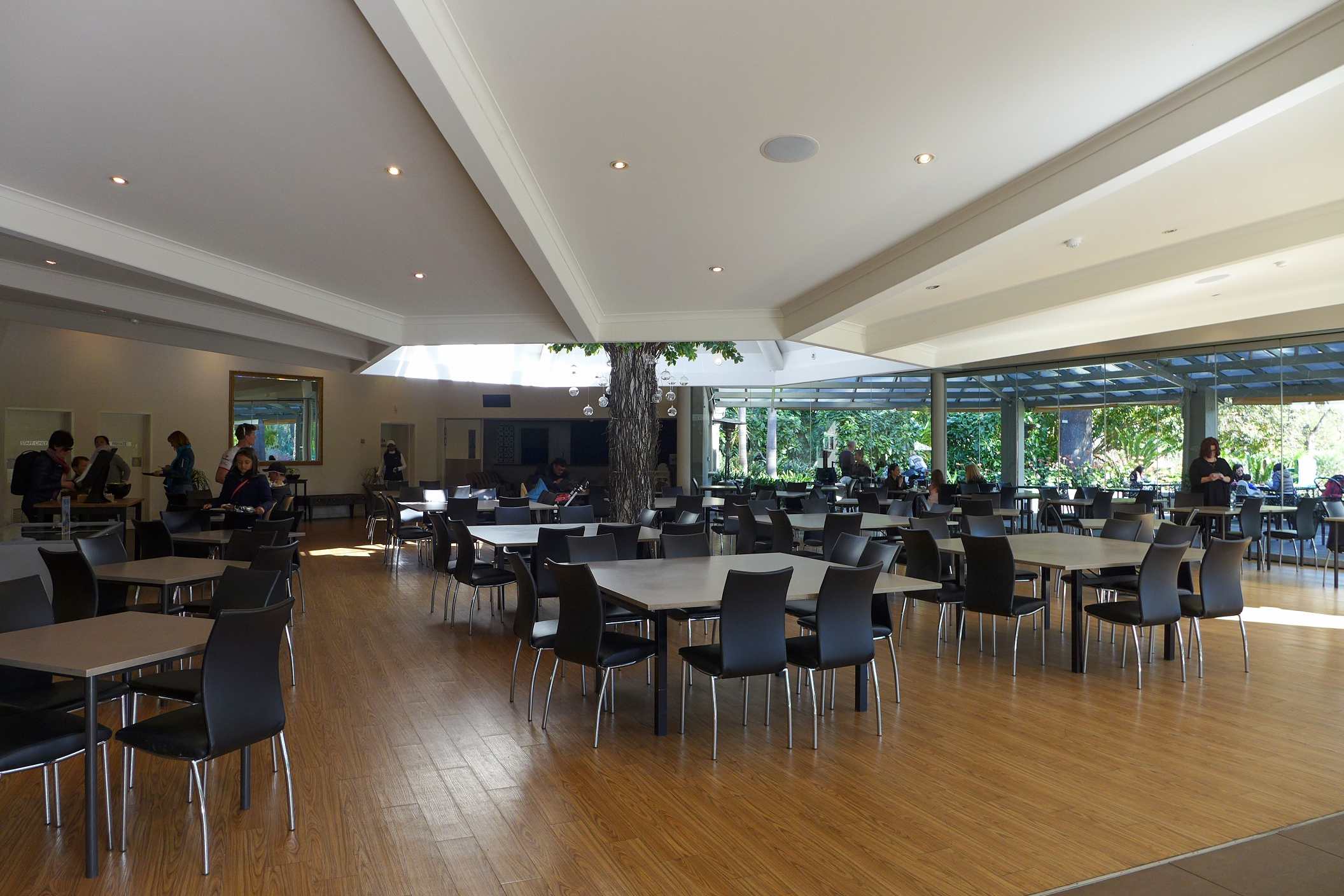
Terrace Restaurant

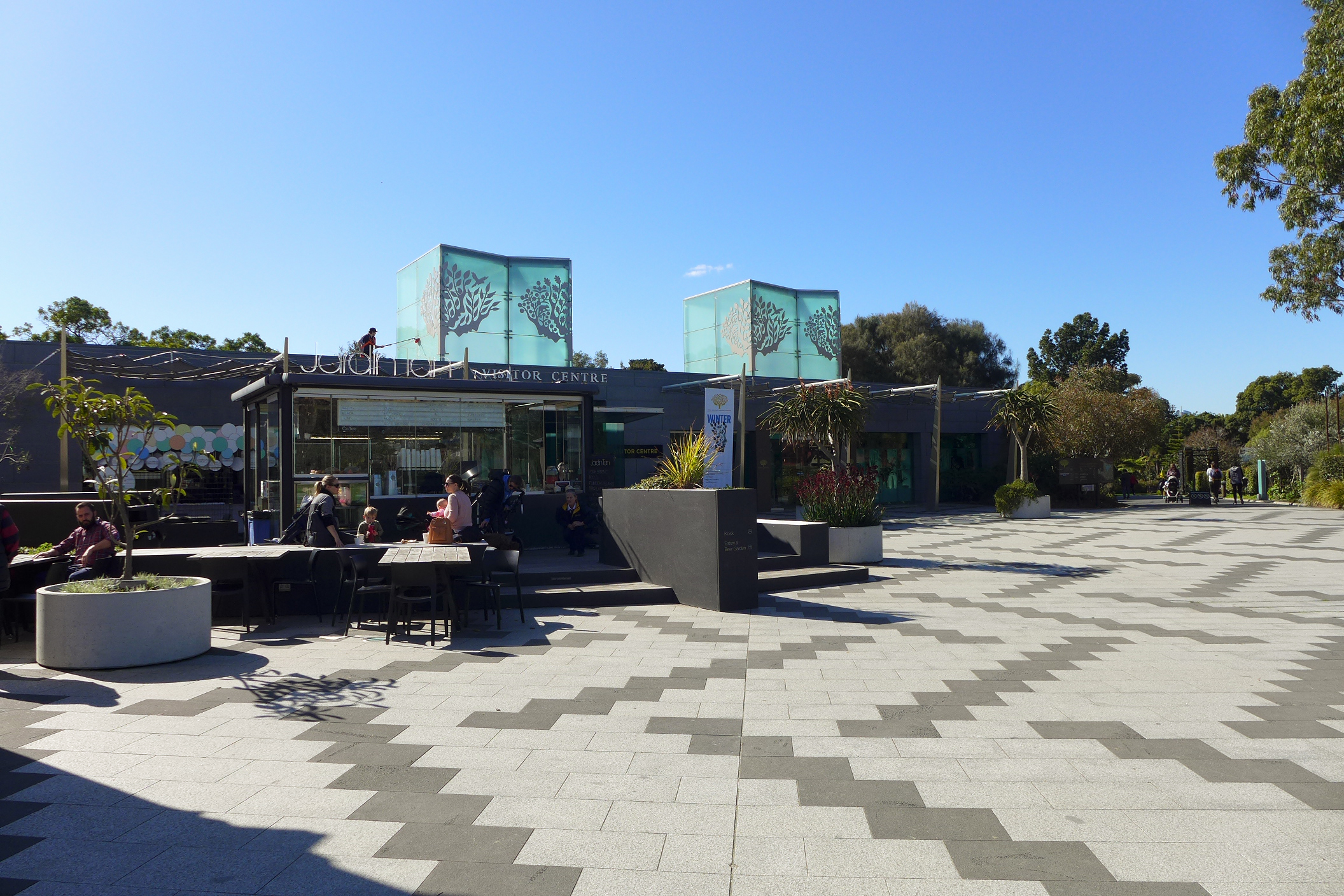
Visitor centre, Melbourne gardens, 2017

== See also ==
- Parks and gardens of Melbourne
- Heritage gardens in Australia
- List of botanical gardens in Victoria
