= National Herbarium of New South Wales =

Centre for plant research in Sydney, Australia

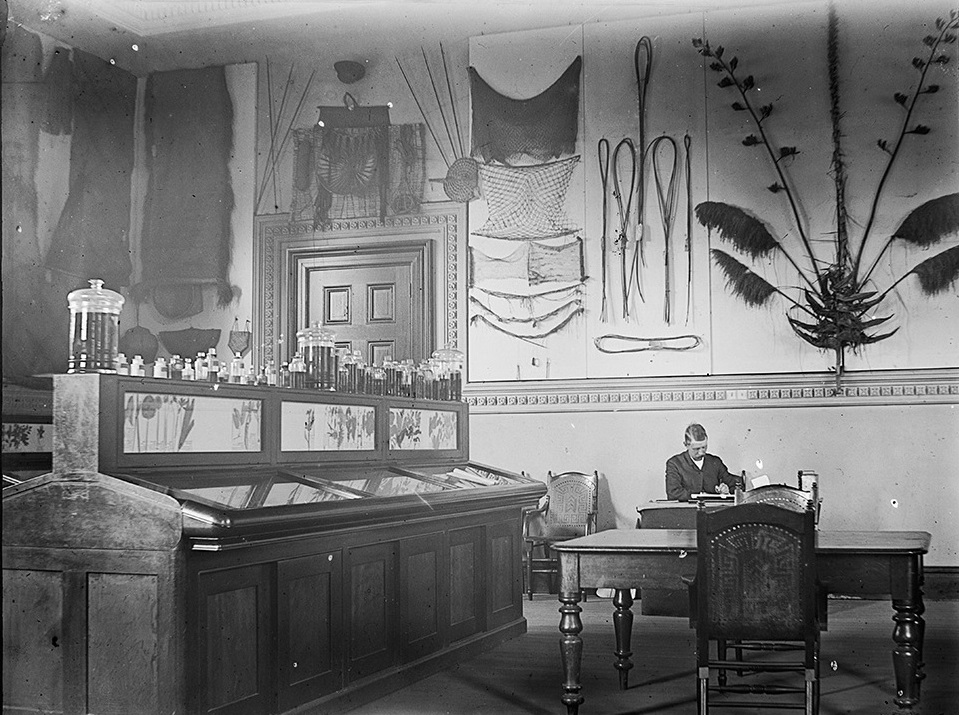
- Joseph Maiden in the Herbarium Royal Botanic Gardens c. 1895
- Established: 1853
- Address: Mrs Macquaries Road, Sydney, NSW, 2000
- Location: Sydney, New South Wales, Australia
- Coordinates: 33.866575°S 151.217923°E
- Interactive map of National Herbarium of New South Wales
- Website: National Herbarium of NSW

The National Herbarium of New South Wales was established in 1853. The Herbarium has a collection of more than 1.4 million plant specimens, making it the second largest collection of pressed, dried plant specimens in Australia, including scientific and historically significant collections and samples of Australian flora gathered by Joseph Banks and Daniel Solander during the voyage of HMS Endeavour in 1770.

The Herbarium is a centre for Australian plant research. These specimens are used for studies of Australian native plants, their relationships and classification. A botanical information service is also provided including native plant identifications.

The National Herbarium is in the Robert Brown Building at the Royal Botanic Garden on Mrs Macquaries Road in Sydney. In June 2018 plans to relocate the Herbarium to a new purpose built Centre of Innovation in Plant Sciences to be at the Australian Botanic Garden Mount Annan were announced. The herbarium is now located within the Mt Annan Botanic Garden site.

In addition to two journals, Telopea and Cunninghamia, the herbarium is responsible for the online database (and keys) to NSW Flora, PlantNet.

The Index Herbariorum Code for the National Herbarium of New South Wales is NSW.

== History ==
The Herbarium began in 1853 when Charles Moore, Director of the Botanic Garden, assembled approximately 1,800 native specimens. However, the establishment date is said to be 1896 by the encyclopedia of Australian Science.

=== Buildings ===
1901–1982: A purpose-built building to house the Herbarium collection and a botanical museum designed by the Government Architect opened in 1901. The building was known as Maiden's Herbarium. It is now known as the Anderson Building and is used for administration and contains the Maiden Theatre, in memory of Joseph Henry Maiden, a previous Botanic Garden's Director.

1982–2018: The Robert Brown Building opened in 1982. The new Herbarium building was named in honour of colonial botanist Robert Brown. It has three levels when it was opened in 1982 by Neville Wran, housing the herbarium collection, staff offices, a laboratory, scanning electron microscope and full drying room and library. A decade later, a fourth level was added to provide more work spaces and shelving and a sloping roof to stop leaks.

2019–onwards: In June 2018 plans to relocate the Herbarium to a new purpose built Centre of Innovation in Plant Sciences to be at the Australian Botanic Garden Mount Annan were announced.The herbarium is now located within the Mt Annan Botanic Garden site.

== Collection ==
The collection has a worldwide scope with an emphasis on plants of New South Wales and Australian flora including flowering plants, conifers, cycads, ferns, bryophytes, lichens, macroalgae and fungi. The collection includes 805 of the specimens Joseph Banks and Daniel Solander collected.

Specimen records from the collection are contributed to Australia's Virtual Herbarium (AVH), a collaborative project of the Commonwealth, state and territory herbaria in Australia.

=== Digitisation ===
More than 7,000 of the specimens were digitised as part of the Global Plants Initiative. These digitised specimens form part of the Australasian Virtual Herbarium, an online resource available for anyone to use. On 4 June 2018 the announcement that the National Herbarium of NSW would close while the collection of plant specimens was relocated from the Royal Botanic Garden Sydney to a purpose-built facility at Australian Botanic Garden Mount Annan included the plans to digitise 1.43 million herbarium plant specimens.

=== Botanical illustration ===
The first botanical illustrator at the Royal Botanic Gardens Sydney, Margaret Flockton, was appointed in 1901 when the National Herbarium opened.

== Publications ==
The Herbarium publishes the journal, Telopea, formerly entitled Contributions from the New South Wales National Herbarium. The journal covers botany in Australia and the Asia-Pacific region, specialising in the flora of New South Wales.

The herbarium also publishes an online key to the plants of New South Wales, together with their descriptions via PlantNet This online resource is based largely on the Flora of New South Wales

== Daniel Solander Library ==
The library at the Royal Botanic Garden is part of the National Herbarium. It was established in 1852 and is named after Daniel Solander who was employed in 1768 by Joseph Banks to accompany him on James Cook's first voyage to the Pacific.

== See also ==
- National Herbarium of Victoria
- List of herbaria
- Australasian Virtual Herbarium
- List of electronic Floras
