= List of Mucor species =

Mucor is a genus of fungi in the family Mucoraceae.

As of January 2026, Species Fungorum listed the following species:

- Mucor abortisporangium H. Zhao, Y.C. Dai, Yuan Yuan & X.Y. Liu (2023)
- Mucor abundans Povah (1917)
- Mucor acicularis Wallr. (1833)
- Mucor adventitius Oudem. (1902)
- Mucor albicolonius Hyang B. Lee & T.T.T. Nguyen (2024)
- Mucor albovirens Fr. (1815)
- Mucor albus Schrank (1789)
- Mucor aligarensis B.S. Mehrotra & B.R. Mehrotra (1970)
- Mucor alpinus E.C. Hansen (1902)
- Mucor amethysteus Berk. (1836)
- Mucor amethystinus L. Wagner & G. Walther (2019)
- Mucor amphibiorum Schipper (1978)
- Mucor amphisporus H. Zhao, Y.C. Dai, Yuan Yuan & X.Y. Liu (2023)
- Mucor aquosus Dicks. (1793)
- Mucor araneosus Jacq. (1781)
- Mucor arcuatus Mart. (1821)
- Mucor ardhlaengiktus B.S. Mehrotra & B.M. Mehrotra (1979)
- Mucor argenteus With. (1792)
- Mucor ascheae Y.P. Tan, Bishop-Hurley & R.G. Shivas (2023)
- Mucor aseptatophorus Hurdeal, E. Gentekaki, K.D. Hyde & Hyang B. Lee (2021)
- Mucor aspergilloides Zopf (1882)
- Mucor ater Batsch (1783)
- Mucor atramentarius L. Wagner & G. Walther (2019)
- Mucor aurantiacus Hyang B. Lee & T.T.T. Nguyen (2024)
- Mucor aureus Mart. (1821)
- Mucor azygosporus R.K. Benj. (1963)
- Mucor bacilliformis Hesselt. (1954)
- Mucor bainieri B.S. Mehrotra & Baijal (1963)
- Mucor bathogenus Dyr (1939)
- Mucor bifidus Fresen. (1850)
- Mucor bohemicus Dyr (1940)
- Mucor bondarzevii S.A. Kulik (1960)
- Mucor bonordenii Berl. & De Toni (1888)
- Mucor botryoides Schreb. (1771)
- Mucor botrytis Bolton (1790)
- Mucor breviphorus H. Zhao, Y.C. Dai, Yuan Yuan & X.Y. Liu (2023)
- Mucor brunneolus H. Zhao, Y.C. Dai, Yuan Yuan & X.Y. Liu (2023)
- Mucor butyraceus Schaeff. (1774)
- Mucor caatingaensis A.L. Santiago, C.A.F. de Souza & D.X. Lima (2016)
- Mucor caespitulosus Speg. (1898)
- Mucor candidus Yosh. Yamam. (1929)
- Mucor caninus Pers. (1796)
- Mucor carmichaelii Grev. (1824)
- Mucor carneus Schaeff. (1774)
- Mucor carnis Link (1824)
- Mucor carnosus Dicks. (1793)
- Mucor casei Johan-Olsen (1898)
- Mucor caseus With. (1796)
- Mucor castaneae Rabenh. (1844)
- Mucor cellularis Schreb. (1771)
- Mucor cerradoensis L.W.S. Freitas, T.R.L. Cordeiro & A.L. Santiago (2025)
- Mucor cervinoleucus Berk. (1859)
- Mucor changshaensis H. Zhao, Y.C. Dai, Yuan Yuan & X.Y. Liu (2023)
- Mucor cheongyangensis Hyang B. Lee & T.T.T. Nguyen (2020)
- Mucor chiangraiensis Hurdeal, E. Gentekaki, K.D. Hyde & Hyang B. Lee (2021)
- Mucor chlamydosporus H. Zhao, Y.C. Dai, Yuan Yuan & X.Y. Liu (2023)
- Mucor chuxiongensis C.Y. Chai, W.J. Liu, Han Chen & F.L. Hui (2019)
- Mucor ciliatus Bonord. (1864)
- Mucor circinatus D.X. Lima, G. Walther & A.L. Santiago (2017)
- Mucor circinelloides Tiegh. (1875)
- Mucor coccineus Leers (1775)
- Mucor comatus Bainier (1903)
- Mucor communis Bainier (1903)
- Mucor conglomeratus Scholler (1787)
- Mucor conoideus Retz. (1795)
- Mucor corticola Hagem (1910)
- Mucor corymbosus Wallr. (1833)
- Mucor cryophilus Hyang B. Lee & T.T.T. Nguyen (2024)
- Mucor ctenidius (Durrell & M. Fleming) G. Walther & de Hoog (2013)
- Mucor cucurbitarum Berk. & M.A. Curtis (1875)
- Mucor cupressiformis Scop. (1770)
- Mucor cyanocephalus Mart. (1821)
- Mucor cyanogenes Guyot (1917)
- Mucor cylindrosporus Y. Ling (1930)
- Mucor debaryanus Schostak. (1897)
- Mucor decumanus Pall. (1771)
- Mucor delicatulus Berk. (1836)
- Mucor delicatus L.S. Loh & Kuthub. (2001)
- Mucor dematium Fr. (1815)
- Mucor dimiaei Schulzer (1866)
- Mucor dimicii Schulzer, Kanitz & J.A. Knapp (1866)
- Mucor donglingensis H. Zhao, Y.C. Dai, Yuan Yuan & X.Y. Liu (2023)
- Mucor druparum Retz. (1795)
- Mucor durus G. Walther & de Hoog (2013)
- Mucor echinophilus Schwein. (1832)
- Mucor echinulatus F.S. Paine (1927)
- Mucor ellipsoideus Ed. Álvarez, Cano, Stchigel, Deanna A. Sutton & Guarro (2011)
- Mucor endophyticus (R.Y. Zheng & H. Jiang) J. Pawłowska & G. Walther (2013)
- Mucor erectus Bainier (1884)
- Mucor erysimi Sowerby (1803)
- Mucor eugeniae L.S. Loh & Nawawi (2001)
- Mucor eugenieae L.S. Loh & Nawawi (2001)
- Mucor exitiosus Massee (1901)
- Mucor exponens (Burgeff) G. Walther & de Hoog (2013)
- Mucor falcatus Schipper (1967)
- Mucor fimbrius Nees (1816)
- Mucor fimeti Schrank (1789)
- Mucor flavus Bainier (1903)
- Mucor floccosus H. Zhao, Y.C. Dai, Yuan Yuan & X.Y. Liu (2023)
- Mucor flocculentus Balb. (1801)
- Mucor fluvii Hyang B. Lee, S.Hee Lee & T.T.T. Nguyen (2018)
- Mucor fodinus Link (1824)
- Mucor fragiformis Schaeff. (1774)
- Mucor fragilis Bainier (1884)
- Mucor funebris Speg. (1898)
- Mucor fungorum Schrank (1789)
- Mucor fuscescens Yosh. Yamam. (1929)
- Mucor fuscipes Sowerby (1803)
- Mucor fuscus (Berk. & M.A. Curtis) Berl. & De Toni (1888)
- Mucor fusiformis G. Walther & de Hoog (2013)
- Mucor fusiformisporus H. Zhao, Y.C. Dai, Yuan Yuan & X.Y. Liu (2023)
- Mucor genevensis Lendn. (1907)
- Mucor geophilus Oudem. (1902)
- Mucor germinans Na Li, Bowling, de Hoog & A. Seyedm. (2024)
- Mucor gigasporus G.Q. Chen & R.Y. Zheng (1987)
- Mucor glandifer Bonord. (1864)
- Mucor glaucescens Berl. & De Toni (1888)
- Mucor globifer Link (1824)
- Mucor globosus Schreb. (1771)
- Mucor glutinatus Hyang B. Lee & T.T.T. Nguyen (2024)
- Mucor gracilentus Fr. (1829)
- Mucor granosus Scholler (1787)
- Mucor granulatus Schaeff. (1774)
- Mucor granulosus Bull. (1791)
- Mucor griseocyanus Hagem (1908)
- Mucor griseolus Yosh. Yamam. (1929)
- Mucor griseosporus Povah (1917)
- Mucor griseus Bonord. (1864)
- Mucor grylli Hyang B. Lee & T.T.T. Nguyen (2022)
- Mucor guilliermondii Nadson & Filippov (1925)
- Mucor hachijyoensis Ts. Watan. (1994)
- Mucor harpali Hyang B. Lee, P.M. Kirk & T.T.T. Nguyen (2021)
- Mucor heilongjiangensis H. Zhao, Y.C. Dai, Yuan Yuan & X.Y. Liu (2023)
- Mucor hemisphaericus H. Zhao, Y.C. Dai, Yuan Yuan & X.Y. Liu (2023)
- Mucor heterogamus Vuill. (1887)
- Mucor heterosporus A. Fisch. (1892)
- Mucor hiemalis Wehmer (1903)
- Mucor homothallicus H. Zhao, Y.C. Dai, Yuan Yuan & X.Y. Liu (2023)
- Mucor hyalinosporus H. Zhao, Y.C. Dai, Yuan Yuan & X.Y. Liu (2023)
- Mucor hyalinus Cooke (1871)
- Mucor hyangburmii T.T.T. Nguyen (2022)
- Mucor hygrophilus Oudem. (1902)
- Mucor imperceptibilis Schrank (1813)
- Mucor inaequalis Peck (1874)
- Mucor inaequisporus Dade (1937)
- Mucor indicus Lendn. (1930)
- Mucor irregularis Stchigel, Cano, Guarro & Ed. Álvarez (2011)
- Mucor jansseni Lendn. (1907)
- Mucor japonicus (Komin.) G. Walther & de Hoog (2013)
- Mucor juglandis Link (1809)
- Mucor koreanus Hyang B. Lee, S.J. Jeon & T.T. Nguyen (2016)
- Mucor kunryangriensis Hyang B. Lee & T.T.T. Nguyen (2022)
- Mucor lacteus Leers (1775)
- Mucor lahorensis J.H. Mirza, S.M. Khan, S. Begum & Shagufta (1979)
- Mucor lateritius Link (1824)
- Mucor lausannensis Lendn. (1907)
- Mucor laxorrhizus Y. Ling (1930)
- Mucor lilianae Voglmayr & Clémençon (2015)
- Mucor limpidus Bainier (1903)
- Mucor lobatus H. Zhao, Y.C. Dai, Yuan Yuan & X.Y. Liu (2023)
- Mucor lusitanicus Bruderl. (1916)
- Mucor luteus Linnem. ex Wrzosek (2010)
- Mucor lycoperdoides Scop. (1770)
- Mucor megalocarpus G. Walther & de Hoog (2013)
- Mucor meguroensis Ts. Watan. (1994)
- Mucor melanocephalos Opiz (1852)
- Mucor melittophthorus H. Hoffm. (1857)
- Mucor merdicola C.A.F. de Souza & A.L. Santiago (2016)
- Mucor merdophylus D.X. Lima, R.W. Barreto, Hyang B. Lee & A.L. Santiago (2020)
- Mucor microscopicus Tode (1783)
- Mucor microsporus Bonord. (1864)
- Mucor miniatusjacquinii Scholler (1787)
- Mucor minutus (Baijal & B.S. Mehrotra) Schipper (1975)
- Mucor mirus F.S. Paine (1927)
- Mucor modestus Bainier (1884)
- Mucor moelleri (Vuill.) Lendn. (1908)
- Mucor mollis Bainier (1884)
- Mucor moniliformis H. Zhao, Y.C. Dai, Yuan Yuan & X.Y. Liu (2023)
- Mucor monstruosus Schreb. (1771)
- Mucor mousanensis Baijal & B.S. Mehrotra (1966)
- Mucor mucedo Fresen. (1850)
- Mucor mucilago Scop. (1772)
- Mucor multiplex (R.Y. Zheng) G. Walther & de Hoog (2013)
- Mucor mustelinus Pišpek (1929)
- Mucor mutabilis Willd. (1788)
- Mucor mycetomi Gelonesi (1927)
- Mucor mycobanche Link (1824)
- Mucor nanus Schipper & Samson (1994)
- Mucor nederlandicus Váňová (1991)
- Mucor nidicola A.A. Madden, Stchigel, Guarro, Deanna A. Sutton & Starks (2012)
- Mucor nidulans Scholler (1787)
- Mucor nigrescens Schumach. (1803)
- Mucor niveus Leers (1775)
- Mucor obvelatus Retz. (1779)
- Mucor odoratus Treschew (1940)
- Mucor oogenes Spring (1852)
- Mucor orantomantidis Hyang B. Lee, P.M. Kirk & T.T.T. Nguyen (2019)
- Mucor orientalis H. Zhao, Y.C. Dai, Yuan Yuan & X.Y. Liu (2023)
- Mucor pakistanicus J.H. Mirza, S.M. Khan, S. Begum & Shagufta (1979)
- Mucor pallidus Naumov (1914)
- Mucor papulaeformis DC. (1801)
- Mucor paraorantomantidis Hyang B. Lee & T.T.T. Nguyen (2024)
- Mucor paronychius Suth.-Campb. & Plunkett (1934)
- Mucor parviseptatus G. Walther & de Hoog (2013)
- Mucor parvisporus Kanouse (1924)
- Mucor penicillatus Bull. (1791)
- Mucor penicillium Schnetzl. (1877)
- Mucor pernambucoensis C.L. Lima, D.X. Lima & A.L. Santiago (2018)
- Mucor petiolatus Gled. (1753)
- Mucor phayaoensis Hurdeal, E. Gentekaki & K.D. Hyde (2021)
- Mucor pilobolus Sorokin (1871)
- Mucor piriformis A. Fisch. (1892)
- Mucor plasmaticus Tiegh. (1875)
- Mucor platensis Speg. (1891)
- Mucor plumbeus Bonord. (1864)
- Mucor polymorphosporus Pišpek (1929)
- Mucor polysporus Yosh. Yamam. (1929)
- Mucor pontiae Sorokin (1871)
- Mucor prayagensis B.S. Mehrotra & Nand ex Schipper (1978)
- Mucor prolificus Bainier (1903)
- Mucor pruinosus Berk. & Broome (1875)
- Mucor pseudocircinelloides L. Wagner & G. Walther (2019)
- Mucor pseudolusitanicus L. Wagner & G. Walther (2019)
- Mucor psychrophilus Milko (1971)
- Mucor punjabensis J.H. Mirza, S.M. Khan, S. Begum & Shagufta (1979)
- Mucor pygmaeus Link (1824)
- Mucor querneus Sowerby (1803)
- Mucor racemosus Fresen. (1850)
- Mucor radiatus H. Zhao, Y.C. Dai, Yuan Yuan & X.Y. Liu (2023)
- Mucor radicans Bals.-Criv. (1835)
- Mucor ramosissimus Samouts. (1927)
- Mucor ravidus L.S. Loh & Nawawi (2001)
- Mucor renisporus K. Jacobs & Botha (2008)
- Mucor reticulatus Bainier (1903)
- Mucor rhizophilus Garjeanne (1911)
- Mucor rhizosporus H. Zhao, Y.C. Dai, Yuan Yuan & X.Y. Liu (2023)
- Mucor rhombospora Ehrenb. (1818)
- Mucor robustus H. Zhao, Y.C. Dai, Yuan Yuan & X.Y. Liu (2023)
- Mucor rongii F.R. Bai & Chi Cheng (2021)
- Mucor roridulus With. (1776)
- Mucor rubens Vuill. (1887)
- Mucor rubescens Léger (1895)
- Mucor rudolphii Voglmayr & Clémençon (2015)
- Mucor saprophilus Novot. (1950)
- Mucor sarawakensis L.S. Loh & Nawawi (2001)
- Mucor saturninus Hagem (1910)
- Mucor scoparius Retz. (1795)
- Mucor septatiphorus C.A.F. de Souza, T.R.L. Cordeiro & A.L. Santiago (2023)
- Mucor setaceus L. (1753)
- Mucor shermaniae Y.P. Tan, Minns & E. Lacey (2024)
- Mucor silvaticus Hagem (1908)
- Mucor sinensis Milko & Beliakova (1971)
- Mucor sinosaturninus H. Zhao, Y.C. Dai, Yuan Yuan & X.Y. Liu (2023)
- Mucor soli C.A.F. Souza, E.V. de Medeiros & R.J.V. Oliveira (2024)
- Mucor souzae C.A.F. de Souza, D.X. Lima & A.L. Santiago (2018)
- Mucor spinosus Schrank (1813)
- Mucor stercorarius Hyang B. Lee, P.M. Kirk, K. Voigt & T.T.T. Nguyen (2017)
- Mucor stercoreus (Tode) Link (1824)
- Mucor stipitatus L. (1753)
- Mucor stipiteramoso L. (1753)
- Mucor stipitoramosoracemato Rein. Schmidt (1929)
- Mucor strictus Hagem (1908)
- Mucor subabundans Dyr (1940)
- Mucor subchlorosporus Naumov (1915)
- Mucor subtilissimus Berk. (1848)
- Mucor succosus Berk. (1841)
- Mucor sufu Wai (1928)
- Mucor suhagiensis M.D. Mehrotra (1964)
- Mucor sympodialis L.S. Loh & Kuthub. (2001)
- Mucor syphiliticus Hallier (1869)
- Mucor taeniae Fairm. (1890)
- Mucor takensis Hurdeal, E. Gentekaki & K.D. Hyde (2021)
- Mucor tanatus L.S. Loh & Nawawi (2001)
- Mucor terrestris Link (1824)
- Mucor thecarum Röhl. (1813)
- Mucor thermohyalospora Subrahm. (1983)
- Mucor thermorhizoides Abramczyk (2024)
- Mucor timomeni Hyang B. Lee & T.T.T. Nguyen (2024)
- Mucor tofus Y.N. Wang & R.Y. Zheng (2022)
- Mucor tremelloides Schrank (1789)
- Mucor trichoides Sowerby (1803)
- Mucor tristis Bainier (1884)
- Mucor troglophilus Zalar (1997)
- Mucor truncorum Link (1809)
- Mucor tubulosus Retz. (1779)
- Mucor ucrainicus Milko (1971)
- Mucor unctuosus L. (1755)
- Mucor urceolatus Dicks. (1785)
- Mucor varians Povah (1917)
- Mucor variicolumellatus L. Wagner & G. Walther (2019)
- Mucor variosporus Schipper (1978)
- Mucor verticillatus L.S. Loh & Kuthub. (2001)
- Mucor vicinus Bainier (1903)
- Mucor virens Batsch (1783)
- Mucor viridescens L. (1774)
- Mucor vitis Hildebr. (1867)
- Mucor vulgaris Bainier (1903)
- Mucor yunnanensis Gajanayake., Karun. & Jayaward. (2023)
- Mucor zonatus Milko (1967)
- Mucor zychae Baijal & B.S. Mehrotra (1966)
