= Helicostylum elegans =

Scientific classification
- Kingdom: Fungi
- Division: Mucoromycota
- Class: Mucoromycetes
- Order: Mucorales
- Family: Mucoraceae
- Genus: Helicostylum
- Species: H. elegans

Binomial name
- Helicostylum elegans Corda 1842

Synonyms
- Ascophora amoena Preuss, 1852; Chaetostylum circinans Bainier, 1906; Chaetostylum elegans (Corda) Zycha, 1935; Chaetostylum venustellum (Lythgoe) Zycha, Siepmann & Linnem., 1969; Haynaldia umbrina Schulzer, in Schulzer, Kanitz & Knapp, 1866; Helicostylum intermedium Morini, 1902; Helicostylum venustellum Lythgoe, 1958; Pleurocystis helicostylum Bonord., 1851; Thamnidium amoenum (Preuss) J. Schröt., in Engler & Prantl, 1894; Thamnidium helicostylum (Bonord.) Pound, 1894

Species of fungus

Helicostylum elegans is a species of fungus in the family Mucoraceae.
