= Meat spoilage =

Decomposition of meat by microorganisms

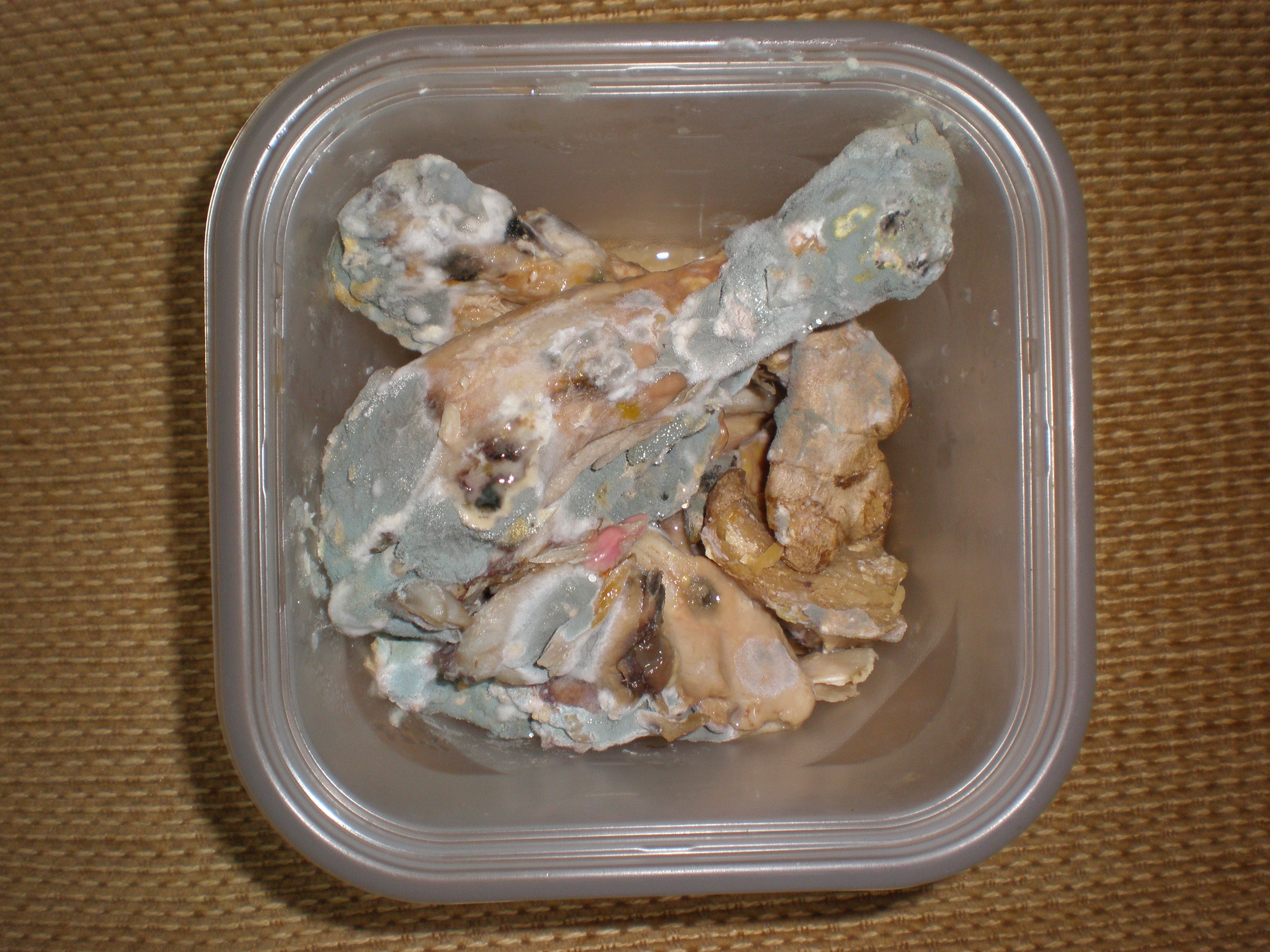
Moldy chicken

The spoilage of meat occurs, if the meat is untreated, in a matter of hours or days and results in the meat becoming unappetizing, poisonous, or infectious. Spoilage is caused by the practically unavoidable infection and subsequent decomposition of meat by bacteria and fungi, which are borne by the animal itself, by the people handling the meat, and by their implements. Meat can be kept edible for a much longer time – though not indefinitely – if proper hygiene is observed during production and processing, and if appropriate food safety, food preservation and food storage procedures are applied.

== Infection ==
The organisms spoiling meat may infect the animal either while still alive ("endogenous disease") or may contaminate the meat after its slaughter ("exogenous disease"). There are numerous diseases that humans may contract from endogenously infected meat, such as anthrax, bovine tuberculosis, brucellosis, salmonellosis, listeriosis, trichinosis or taeniasis.

Infected meat, however, should be eliminated through systematic meat inspection in production, and consequently, consumers will more often encounter meat exogenously spoiled by bacteria or fungi after the death of the animal. One source of infectious organisms is bacteraemia, the presence of bacteria in the blood of slaughtered animals. The large intestine of animals contains some 3.3×10^{13} viable bacteria, which may infect the flesh after death if the carcass is improperly dressed. Contamination can also occur at the slaughterhouse through the use of improperly cleaned slaughter or dressing implements, such as powered knives, on which bacteria persist. A captive bolt pistol's bolt alone may carry about 400,000 bacteria per square centimeter. After slaughter, care must be taken not to infect the meat through contact with any of the various sources of infection in the abattoir, notably the hides and soil adhering to them, water used for washing and cleaning, the dressing implements and the slaughterhouse personnel.

Bacterial genera commonly infecting meat while it is being processed, cut, packaged, transported, sold and handled include Salmonella spp., Shigella spp., E. coli, B. proteus, S. epidermidis and Staph. aureus, Cl. welchii, B. cereus and faecal streptococci. These bacteria are all commonly carried by humans; infectious bacteria from the soil include Cl. botulinum. Among the molds commonly infecting meat are Penicillium, Mucor, Cladosporium, Alternaria, Sporotrichium and Thamnidium.

As these microorganisms colonize a piece of meat, they begin to break it down, leaving behind toxins that can cause enteritis or food poisoning, potentially lethal in the rare case of botulism. The microorganisms do not survive a thorough cooking of the meat, but several of their toxins and microbial spores do. The microbes may also infect the person eating the meat, although against this the microflora of the human gut is normally an effective barrier.

== Testing ==
The presence of infectious agents can be detected with a number of tests during the production and processing of meat, but testing by itself is not sufficient to ensure adequate food safety. The industry-standard Hazard Analysis Critical Control Points (HACCP) system provides for a comprehensive quality management framework as a part of which such tests can be conducted. Testing methods applied include phage and serological typing, direct epifluorescence filter techniques (DEFT) and plasmid profiling.

== Symptoms ==
=== Microbial spoilage ===
Depending on oxygen availability, meat spoilage by micro-organisms can manifest itself as follows:

Oxygen	Microbial agent	Symptoms
Present	Aerobic bacteria	Surface slime; Discolouration; Gas production; Change in odor; Fat decomposition
Present	Yeasts	Surface slime; Discoloration; Change in odor and taste; Fat decomposition
Present	Molds	Sticky and "whiskery" surface; Discoloration; Change in odor; Fat decomposition
Absent	Anaerobic bacteria	Putrefaction and foul odors; Gas production; Souring
