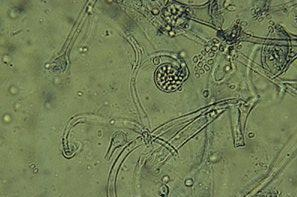

Scientific classification
- Kingdom: Fungi
- Division: Mucoromycota
- Class: Mucoromycetes
- Order: Mucorales
- Family: Mucoraceae
- Genus: Mucor
- Species: M. circinelloides

Binomial name
- Mucor circinelloides Tieghem (1875)

Synonyms
- Calyptromyces circinelloides Tiegh. (1910); Circinomucor circinelloides Tiegh. (1982); Mucor javanicus Wehmer, et al. (1900); Mucor dubius Wehmer, et al. (1901); Mucor prainii Chodat & Nechitsche (1904); Mucor mandshuricus (1904)

= Mucor circinelloides =

Species of fungus

Mucor circinelloides is a dimorphic fungus belonging to the Order Mucorales (Phylum Mucoromycota). It has a worldwide distribution, found mostly in soil, dung and root vegetables. This species is described as not known to be able to produce mycotoxins, however it has been frequently reported to infect animals such as cattle and swine, as well as fowl, platypus and occasionally humans. Ketoacidotic patients are particularly at risk for infection by M. circinelloides.

== History and taxonomy ==
Mucor circinelloides is one of the common species in the genus Mucor. Mucor circinelloides is a variable species that include several variants such as; M. circinelloides f. circinelloides; M. circinelloides f. lusitanicus; M. circinelloides f. griseocyanus and M. circinelloides f. janssenii.

== Growth and morphology ==
Mucor circinelloides reproduce both asexually and sexually. The asexual sporangiophores are found as two types: elongate and sympodially branched. The elongate sporangiophores have larger sporangia, which are white at first and progressively turn greenish brown in colour. They assume a globose shape and are 40–80 μm in size; characterized as "bobbing heads". Sporangiophores are mostly sympodially branched with small sporangia (25 μm); branches are and sometimes circinate. The diameter of the sporangia range from 20 to 80 μm. Sporangia have slightly encrusted walls. In larger sporangia, the membranes are deliquescent, whereas they are persistent in the smaller ones and rupture at maturity. Smaller sporangia also have smooth persistent walls. Sporangiophores are ellipsoid (6–7 μm in diameter) or subglobose (4–6 μm in diameter). Numerous chlamydospores are also produced.

Colonies are fast growing and go up to 2 cm in height. On Czapek Yeast Autolysate (CYA) plates, the colony growth is low and sparse, most often spreading across the entire Petri dish. These colonies of 60 mm diameter or more appear to be pale grey or yellow in colour, with the reverse being uncoloured. Colonies also fill up the entire Petri dish of malt extract agar, producing colony colours similar to those observed on CYA. Mucor circinelloides can assume a yeast-like growth form. It has been isolated in this yeast form from human urine and normal stool specimen. It has also been recovered as a yeast from frogs.

== Physiology ==
Mucor circinelloides has good growth and sporulation between 5–10 °C and very poor growth at 37 °C which is also the maximum growth temperature. The minimal water activity (a_{w}) for growth is 0.9. M. circinelloides assimilates ethanol and nitrate. The length and number of tall sporangiophores decrease with lower temperatures. Spores are broadly ellipsoid (4.4-6.8 x 3.7-4.7 μm). Growth, sporulation, and presence of tall and short sporangiophores can be influenced by temperature; however sporangiophore shape, size and uniformity are not influenced by temperatures.

== Habitat and ecology ==
At least 20 species belonging to the genus Mucor are found to be extracted from food. M. circinelloides is one of the five most significant fungus out of these 20 along with M. hiemalis, M. piriformis, M. plumbeus and M. racemosus. It has been reported to spoil cheese and yams as well as diseases of mango. This fungus has also been isolated from various foods such as meat, hazelnuts, walnuts, maize, mung beans, soybeans and barley.

Fungi in the order Mucorales class have not been investigated in detail for their ability to produce mycotoxins; Cytotoxicity and mycotoxin-production was analysed and tested for using the cytotoxicity test (MTT assay) and LC/MS/MS-based multimycotoxin method respectively for three fungal species, including M. circinelloides. Mucor circinelloides was found to be able to produce 3-nitropropionic acid as well as have low cytotoxicity. Conventionally, M. circinelloides is considered not to produce mycotoxins.

== Pathogenicity ==
Mucor circinelloides is considered an emerging pathogen, although it has only been associated rarely with very human disease and have been limited to cutaneous infection. This species is occasionally isolated from humans, birds, cattle, and swine.

== Antioxidant potential ==
Mucor circinelloides is potentially a rich source of antioxidants and other secondary metabolites which could be used in the development of nutraceuticals and natural antioxidants.
