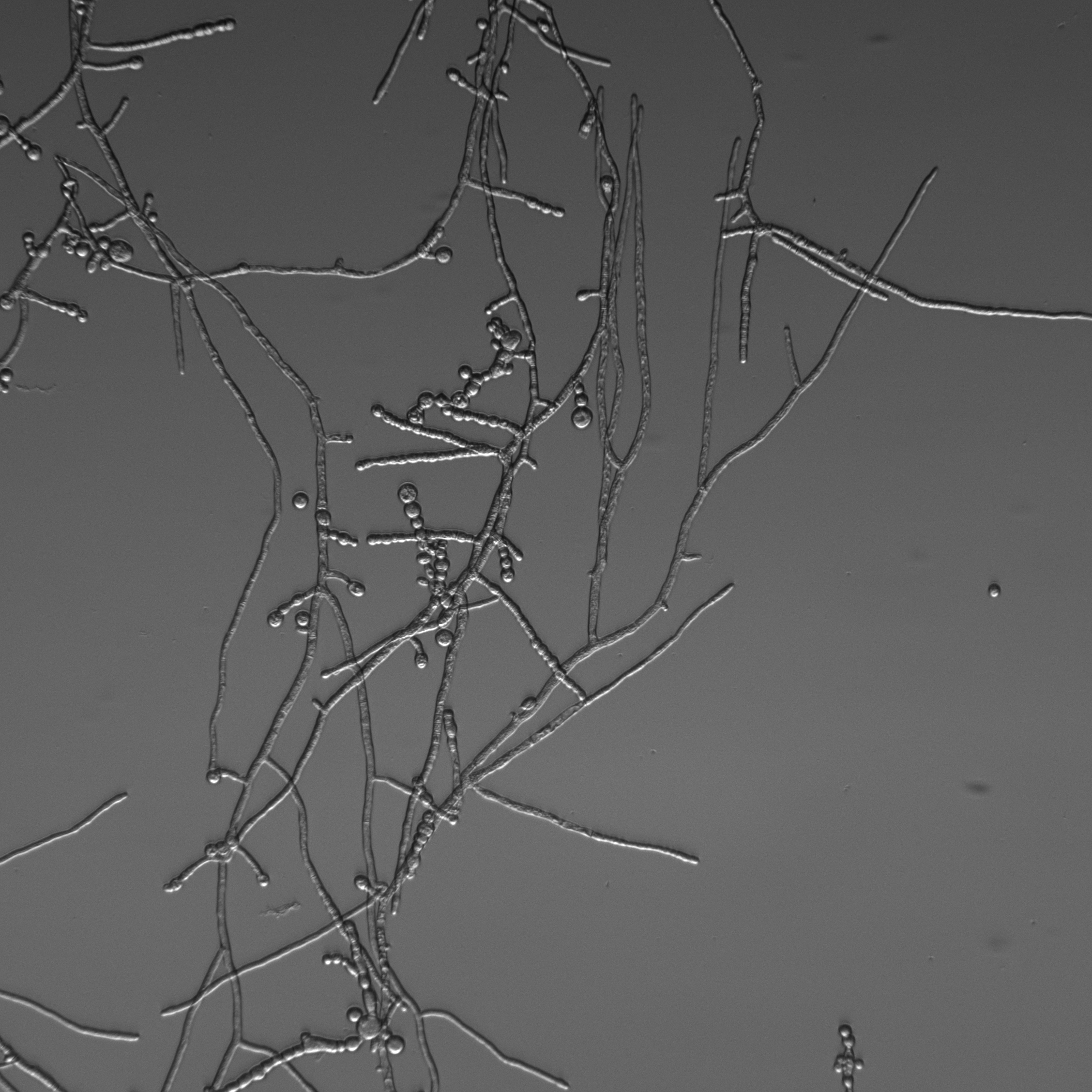

Scientific classification
- Kingdom: Fungi
- Division: Mucoromycota
- Class: Mucoromycetes
- Order: Mucorales
- Family: Mucoraceae
- Genus: Mucor
- Species: M. bainieri

Binomial name
- Mucor bainieri B.S. Mehrotra & Baijal

= Mucor bainieri =

Species of fungus

Mucor bainieri is a species of dimorphic fungus belonging to Mucor. The type strain of M. bainieri was isolated from the soil in Uttar Pradesh, India. It was recently classified as the Phylogenetic Species PS3 under the order Mucorales, and is somewhat closely related to M. pseudolusitanicus.
