= California Homemade Food Act =

2013 California state law

The California Homemade Food Act is a law that legalizes the manufacture and sale of certain homemade food products. Introduced as bill AB1616, the California Homemade Food Act was signed by Governor Jerry Brown and became law effective January 1, 2013.

Prior to the enactment of the California Homemade Food Act, entrepreneurs were subjected to the same regulations as commercial restaurants and bakeries. Food safety laws forced owners to have to rent part of a retail kitchen and prepare all of their products there. Rental costs, along with the costs of complying with other health regulations, made it difficult for small-scale homemade food businesses to turn a profit. This law allows home cooks to run enterprises, termed a Cottage Food Operation or a "CFO", that manufacture "low-risk" foods from within the individual's home. These "low-risk" foods must be less susceptible to bacterial growth that could cause food poisoning; they must be able to stay fresh without needing refrigeration. For this reason, Cottage Food Operations are still barred from selling dairy products and meat. The California Department of Public Health has compiled a list of "low-risk" foods, which are approved for a CFO to produce, prepare, package, and peddle to customers out of their "private home". A CFO is limited to producing and selling foods found on this list. A "private home" can be either owned or rented by the operator of the CFO, and thus includes both houses and apartments.

The California Homemade Food Act also relaxes many zoning restrictions for CFOs, since traditional bakeries would not be allowed to operate out of a residential area. Nevertheless, Cottage Food Operations will still have to apply for a permit from the County Department of Health and follow numerous other regulations set under the law.

== Legislative history ==
On February 8, 2012, Mike Gatto, the assemblyman for the 43rd district, introduced the California Homemade Food Act on to the floor of the California State Assembly. Gatto authored the bill in response to the closure of a cottage food business of one of his constituents. Mark Stambler's homemade bread business was deemed in violation of food safety laws by the Los Angeles County Department of Public Health and forced to shut down. Gatto's bill sought a state-wide standardization of food safety laws for cottage food industries while curbing regulations Gatto called "paradoxical and nonsensical."

The Assembly passed the bill on May 29, 2012, by a vote of 56–19 with 5 members not voting. The Senate passed the bill along with several amendments on August 30, 2012, by the unanimous vote of the 34 senators present (6 senators did not vote). The Senate amendments required the bill to return to the Assembly, which approved the amended version on August 30 by a vote of 60–16 with 4 Assemblymen not voting. No Assembly members who supported the bill in the first vote opposed the bill in the second vote. There were two assembly members, Connie Conway and Jim Nielsen, who voted against the bill in the first vote but subsequently voted for the bill in the second vote.

Governor Jerry Brown signed the California Homemade Food Act into law on September 21, 2012. Brown praised the bill as a measure to facilitate hiring by California businesses.

== See also ==
- Cottage Industry
