= Mucor ellipsoideus =

Scientific classification
- Domain: Eukaryota
- Kingdom: Fungi
- Division: Mucoromycota
- Class: Mucoromycetes
- Order: Mucorales
- Family: Mucoraceae
- Genus: Mucor
- Species: M. ellipsoideus

Binomial name
- Mucor ellipsoideus Álvarez et al., 2010

Species of fungus

Mucor ellipsoideus is a fungus first isolated from human clinical specimens in the US. M. ellipsoideus is able to grow and sporulate at 37 °C like closely related M. indicus, but the former has narrow ellipsoidal sporangiospores, as compared to the subglobose to ellipsoidal sporangiospores of the latter.
