= Benjaminia =

Benjaminia may refer to:

- Benjaminia (wasp), a genus of wasps in the family Ichneumonidae
- Benjaminia (plant), a genus of plants in the family Plantaginaceae
- Benjaminia, a genus of fungi in the family Mucoraceae; synonym of Benjaminiella
