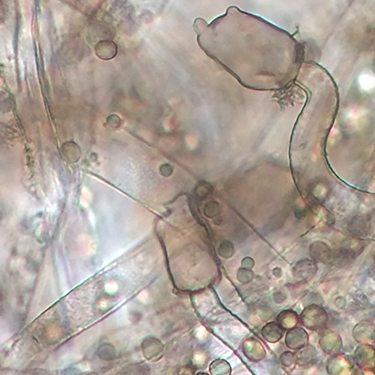

Scientific classification
- Kingdom: Fungi
- Division: Mucoromycota
- Class: Mucoromycetes
- Order: Mucorales
- Family: Mucoraceae
- Genus: Mucor
- Species: M. plumbeus

Binomial name
- Mucor plumbeus Bonord. (1864)

Synonyms
- Mucor spinosus Tieghem (1878); Mucor brunneus Naumov (1935); Mucor brunneogriseus A.K.Sarbhoy (1968)

= Mucor plumbeus =

Species of fungus

Mucor plumbeus is a fungus in the family Mucoraceae (subphylum Mucoromycotina) that is very common, abundant and distributed worldwide. Mucor plumbeus is not known to be a plant or animal pathogen; however it is able to elicit an immune response in humans by activating the complement system. This species is commonly found in various types of soils over a range of pH, although alkaline soils seem more conducive to its growth. It is also known from the roots of wheat, oat and barley. In addition, M. plumbeus is a common fungal contaminant of indoor built environments. This species shares many similarities with M. racemosus, another fungus that belongs to the family Mucoraceae which is known to cause mucormycosis. Mucor plumbeus is a common spoilage agent of cheese, apples, apple cider and yogurt.

== Morphology and reproduction ==
Mucor plumbeus produces columella with distinctive, darkly pigmented, finger-like apical projections. Sporangiophores (structures bearing asexual spores) exhibit sympodial and monopodial branching. The appearance of sporangia of M. plumbeus changes throughout development from hyaline at first becoming dark brown colour at maturity. Sporangiospores are spherical, ranging from 5–7 to 8–10 μm in diameter. Zygospores are also darkly coloured, though much larger than sporangiospores with an average diameter of approximately 85 μm. Zygospores are ornamented with short star-shaped spines (length of 3 μm). The mating system is heterothallic.

Growth on Czapek Yeast Extract Agar (CYA) and Malt Extract Agar (MEA) produces colonies at least 50 mm in diameter, often spreading across the petri dish. The mycelium appear colourless with an overall colour of pale to deep grey from the sporangia. Growth on G25N medium produces colonies 20–35 mm in diameter, which appear white to pale yellow brown. Mucor plumbeus spores are commonly airborne, which could explain their vast distribution. Chlamydospores have at times been found within sporangiophores.

=== Physiology ===
Mucor plumbeus colonies grown in culture were found to develop in the presence of ammonium chloride, L-histidine and urea, suggesting that these compounds are utilised as a nitrogen source. Mucor plumbeus can also use sucrose, D-mannose, D-sorbitol and citric acid as sources of carbon. Zygospores were found to be unable to grow in culture. Mucor plumbeus is capable of growing from 4–5 °C (39–41 °F) to 35 °C (95 °F). The optimal temperature range for growth and sporulation to occur at was found to be 5–20 °C (41–68 °F). It does not grow at 37 °C (99 °F). Primary growth of M. plumbeus was found to be greatly suppressed by garlic extract in in-vivo growth studies. Sporulation can be suppressed by rubratoxin B. Mucor plumbeus can cause self inhibition of its germinating spores with the production of certain factors such as nonanoic acid. In a study conducted to determine the antifungal capabilities of different mixtures of cinnamon and clove oil against various important spoilage microorganisms, M. plumbeus was discovered to be amongst the most resistant organisms. This study also revealed that thymol has effective inhibitory action against M. plumbeus. In nature, M. plumbeus can be found in soils with a wide range in pH - particularly into the alkaline range. The minimum water activity (aw) for growth was reported to be 0.93. The growth of M. plumbeus varied with different gas concentrations. Growth in N_{2} was 80% of that in air. Growth also occurred in an atmosphere of more than 97% CO_{2} with trace amounts of O_{2}. Growth on cheddar cheese in an atmosphere of: 20% CO_{2} and 5% O_{2} was 50% of that in air; 20% CO_{2} and 1% O_{2} was 40% of that in air; 40% CO_{2} and 5% O_{2} was 50% of that in air; 40% CO_{2} and 1% O_{2} was 30% of that in air.

== Symbiotic interactions ==
Hyphae of Mucor plumbeus have been found to be invaded by the hyperparasitic fungi Trichoderma viride and Synchephalis californica. In addition, Mucor plumbeus produces a gas that stimulates the growth of Phytophthora citrophthora, a plant pathogen. The presence of M. plumbeus stimulates the fruiting of Pilobolus kleinii due to the production of ammonia.

== Health implications ==
As of yet, there have not been any reported cases of mycosis associated with M. plumbeus. However, studies have revealed that the spores of M. plumbeus have the ability to activate the complement system in humans via the alternative pathway. In addition, studies involving various complement proteins on fungal surfaces suggest that M. plumbeus spores can activate all pathways of the complement system. Mucor plumbeus is not known to produce any mycotoxins.

== Distribution ==
Mucor plumbeus is distributed worldwide. Samples of M. plumbeus have been collected in numerous countries: as far north as Germany, Austria, Switzerland; as far east as Philippines, Indonesia; as far west as California and far south as South Africa. It is found in dust, soil and hypersaline water. Mucor plumbeus tolerates many soil types: including grassland, desert soils and heathland and has been isolated from the roots of alfalfa, oats, barley, Holcus mollis and other Australian heathland plants. In addition, it has been isolated from bird feathers, hay, decomposing plant debris, dung from different animals, fresh water, wood pulp, beech bark, wood timbers used in a copper mine, seeds of wheat and oat, and pecans. In the indoor built environment, M. plumbeus has been isolated from HVAC filters and has been detected in hospital air. In addition, M. plumbeus has been found to be associated with mould growth on concrete and other floor related materials and house dust. It is also known from foods such as meat, nuts and cereals, and has been isolated in low levels from black rice in Thailand, soybeans in the Philippines and from coriander in Indonesia.

== Chemistry ==
A range of polysaccharides have been found in the extracellular and intracellular compartments of M. plumbeus including fucose, glucose, galactose and mannose. Glucuronic acid, a carbohydrate with a similar structure to glucose, is located specifically in the extracellular region of M. plumbeus. The monosaccharide glucosamine was found only in the intracellular regions of M. plumbeus. Mucor plumbeus has the ability to detoxify pentachlorophenol and has been used in the biotransformation of other products. Incubation of M. plumbeus with the natural product maalioxide produces three metabolites (1,7 and 9 β-hydroxymaalioxide). Mucor plumbeus activity towards camphorquinone is stereoselective. Extracts of Mucor plumbeus have shown acetylcholinesterase enzyme inhibition activity. Mucor plumbeus is able to biocatalyze the hydroxylation of terpenes and steroids by cytochrome p450 enzymes in the presence of O_{2} and cofactor NADPH. Mucor plumbeus also transforms sesquiterpene into a series of 12 degradation products of 10,15-epoxidation. As well, squamulosone (aromadendr-1(10)-en-9-one) is biotransformed by M. plumbeus to yield an array of terpenes.
