= Chaetocladium elegans =

Scientific classification
- Kingdom: Fungi
- Division: Mucoromycota
- Class: Mucoromycetes
- Order: Mucorales
- Family: Mucoraceae
- Genus: Chaetocladium
- Species: C. elegans

Binomial name
- Chaetocladium elegans Zopf (1890)

Species of fungus

Chaetocladium elegans is a species of fungus in the family Mucoraceae.
