= Mucor paronychius =

Scientific classification
- Kingdom: Fungi
- Division: Mucoromycota
- Class: Mucoromycetes
- Order: Mucorales
- Family: Mucoraceae
- Genus: Mucor
- Species: M. paronychius

Binomial name
- Mucor paronychius Suth.-Campb. & Plunkett (1934)

Species of fungus

Mucor paronychius is a fungal plant pathogen.
