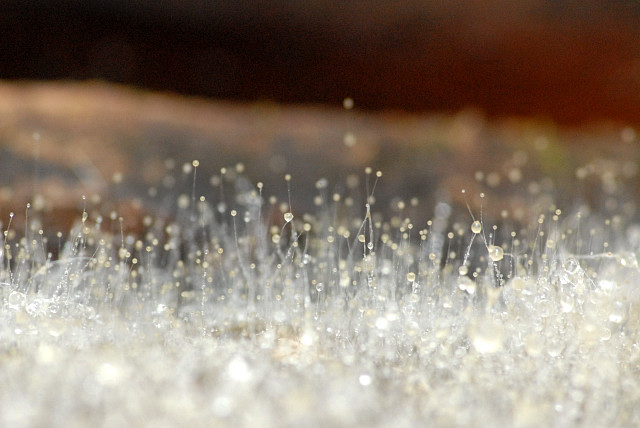

Scientific classification
- Kingdom: Fungi
- Division: Mucoromycota
- Class: Mucoromycetes
- Order: Mucorales
- Family: Mucoraceae
- Genus: Mucor
- Species: M. mucedo

Binomial name
- Mucor mucedo Linnaeus (1753)

Synonyms
- Mucor coprophilus Povah (1917); Mucor griseoochraceus Naumov (1915); Mucor murorum Naumov (1915); Mucor vulgaris P. Micheli (1729)

= Mucor mucedo =

Species of fungus

Mucor mucedo, commonly known as the common pinmould, is a fungal plant pathogen and member of the phylum Mucoromycota and the genus Mucor. Commonly found on soil, dung, water, plants and moist foods, Mucor mucedo is a saprotrophic fungus found world-wide with 85 known strains. It is often mistaken for Rhizopus rots on fruits (i.e. strawberries) due to similar mould growth shape and colour. Contrastingly, however, Mucor mucedo is found to grow on a wide range of stored grains and plants, including cucumber and tomato. Discovered in Italy in 1729 by P.A. Micheli and later noted by Carl Linnaeus in 1753 in the Species Plantarum, Mucor mucedo was originally classified as Mucor vulgaris by Micheli but later classified synonymous under name Mucor mucedo. The species was redescribed as Ascophora mucedo by H.J. Tode in 1790 but this type resided in a stoloniferous habitat and was later made the type of new genus Rhizopus.

== Growth and morphology ==
Mucor mucedo has fast growing colonies and are characterized by tall, simple, unbranched sporangiophores lacking basal rhizoids, non-apophysate sporangia, and pigmented zygosporangial walls. The walls are covered with granules and the swollen apex contains spores that are white or yellow in when immature, and upon maturation appear brownish grey or dark grey. Colonies commonly have a fluffy appearance with heights of up to several centimeters, resembling cotton candy, and the hyphae are non-septate or sparsely septate. Mucor mucedo is heterothallic, and both (+) and (-) mating strains are morphologically indistinguishable although isolates of the (-) strain may exhibit less vigorous mycelial growth in cultivation. The zygophores are highly differentiated from sporangiophores and are known to rarely bare sporangia. Mucor mucedo morphology and growth is influenced by temperature:

- 30 °C - No growth
- 5-25 °C - Growth and sporulation
- 15 °C and below - Recurved short sporangiophores, columellae more narrow and cylindrical-ellipsoidal, sporangiospores larger

Mucor mucedo reproduction occurs in asexual and sexual methods.

Mucor mucedo is also influenced by light, as cultures grown during the day at 20 °C mainly produced tall sporangiophores, rarely producing short sporangiophores or none at all. Cultures drown in the dark grew a dense layer of short sporangiophores with occasional tall ones. A wide range of growth media can be used, but most Mucor mucedo fungi appear to grow well with good mycelial growth and sporulation on pumpkin and sweet potato as well as potato dextrose agar (PDA), consisting of potato starch and dextrose as key carbon sources, due to its rich nutrient availability. An optimal phospholipid environment has been found to be necessary for the normal apical growth and hyphal branching in Mucor mucedo, specifically with dimyristoyl phosphatidylcholine shown to stimulate chitinase activity. Chitinases and chitin synthases are regulated for the lysis and synthesis of the major cell wall component chitin, and have important morphogenetic roles in hyphal growth. Both are inactivated when treated with phospholipases and growth is shunted Chitin synthase activity can also be inhibited by anethole, which is a major component of anise oil that has weak antimicrobial activity with broad antimicrobial spectrum.

== Reproduction ==
Asexual reproduction occurs by the formation of uninucleate, haploid sporangiospores in the sporangia, on the terminal ends of the aerial sporangiophores. In the sporangia, there is an accumulation of nutrients, cytoplasm, and nuclei. An extension of the sporangiophore called the columella protrudes into the sporangium, and upon the maturation of the sporangiospores, burst of the sporangium allows for the dispersion of the spores, where wind is the primary dissemination method. Asexual reproduction may be favoured in unfavourable environmental conditions, as this inhibits the conjugation between the two sexual strains. The (-) strain loses sexual capacity faster than the (+) strain.

As Mucor mucedo are heterothallic, the hyphae taking part in the sexual reproduction have to be of two different strains, either (+) or (-). When these make contact an extension of the hyphae called progametangia are formed and most of the nuclei and cytoplasm accumulate at the ends. Septa form adjacent to the point of contact, and the terminal component, gametangia, are visible with elongated cells called suspensors attached to it. As the gametangia grow and after numerous mitotic divisions, the gametangial wall proceeds to dissolve and gametes found inside fuse, producing a zygote. This zygospore appear black or grey in colour. Under favourable conditions a zygosporangium forms, and the burst of the zygosporangium wall allows for the dispersal of spores. In Mucor mucedo, sexual specificity can be observed between the two mating strains with the production of either 4-hydroxy methyltrisporates for (+) strains and trisporins for (-) strains. These are ultimately converted to trisporic acids, the sexual hormone of M. mucedo and other zygomycetes, which induce the first steps of zygophore development on the opposite mating type. Trisporic acid is a volatile organic C18 compound that is made from β-carotene and retinol pathways, and 4-dihydromethyltrisporate dehydrogenase is found to be an important enzyme in the biosynthesis of trisporic acid.

== Physiology ==
Mucor mucedo is sensitive to the fungicide captafol (terrazol) which inhibits the apical growth of hyphae and, at lower concentrations, promotes thickening of the fungal cell wall. Terrazol, with its fungistatic effect, induces liberation in phospholipases within the mitochondria and other membranes, leading to a complete lysis of the mitochondria. The only known antidote for the effect of terrazol is impure saccharose, which contains phospholipase inhibitors. The cell wall thickening appears to be a side effect of the lowered phosphorylating capability of the mitochondria. Pentachloronitrobenzene (PCNB) causes lysis of the internal structure of the mitochondria in M. mucedo, and the observed effect differs from that of terrazol. PCNB increases the perinuclear space and the number of vacuoles in the cell, and a pathological thickening of the cell wall is also observed. The cell wall thickening occurring in M. mucedo is induced by some fungicides, N2 atmosphere, and high concentrations of glucose in growth media. The appears to be similar to the changes observed when transforming from mycelial to yeast form in dimorphic fungi.

== Habitat and ecology ==
Mucor mucedo has world-wide distribution, and are commonly discovered in Canary Is., Egypt, Great Britain, Ireland, Kenya, Netherlands, Australia, Sri Lanka, Ukraine, China, and Canada.M. mucedo is easily found in dry horse dung around March and April and have the common habitat of soil, dung, water, nose effluent of cow, composted leaf litter, stored grains, and many plants and fruits, such as grapes and tomatoes. It interacts with some animals but are not frequent causative agents of disease, including horse, rabbits, mice, and rats.M. mucedo grows well on cheese and produces the 'cat hair' defect, which is white mould forming on cheese with long, grey, hyphae, giving it the appearance of cat hair.

Mucor mucedo has been found to degrade polycyclic aromatic hydrocarbons (PAHs), a common soil pollutant and contaminant causing high concern, as contamination continues to increase. The species are highly efficient in biodegrading residual PAH in the soil, significantly decreasing it in within 12 days of introduction. Exopolymeric substances (EPS) produced by the fungus, mainly composed of proteins, carbohydrates, and humic-like substances, are responsible for the degradation.

== Mycotoxins ==
Mucor mucedo produces oxalate, or oxalic acid, a simple dicarboxylic acid that is one of the terminal metabolic products of many fungi and plants. It is well known to be toxic to higher animals, including humans, due to its local corrosive effect and affinity for calcium ions, which oxalate reacts with to form water-insoluble calcium crystals. Mucor mucedo also produces aflatoxins, which are known to cause liver cancer and other digestive, urinary, endocrine, haematopoetic, reproductive, and circulatory complications, although this requires further confirmatory studies as aflatoxins are mainly characteristic of Aspergillus species. The ability for mycotoxins to diffuse from the mycelium into the environment depends on its water solubility. Products with high water content, notably cheese and dough, allow significant diffusion of mycotoxins. Aflatoxins have been observed to diffuse into food products without extensive mycelial growth into the food.

=== Human disease ===
Mucor mucedo sometimes cause opportunistic and rapidly spreading infections called mucormycosis. Also referred to as zygomycosis, this necrotizing infection can be life-threatening in diabetic or immuno-suppressed/compromised patients. Mucor mucedo can cause minor infections as well, as there have been reported cases of frequent vomiting and severe purging along with prostration following the consumption of cheese contaminated with M. mucedo mould growth.

=== Amphotericin B ===
Amphotericin B, a drug primarily used for treatment of patients with progressive and potentially life-threatening fungal infections, has been found to be a potent inhibitor of M. mucedo at concentrations of the drug ranging from 0.03 to 1.0 mcg/mL in vitro. Amphotericin B functions by binding to sterols in the cell membrane of fungi leading to change in membrane permeability allowing leakage of intracellular components.
