= Mucor silvaticus =

Scientific classification
- Kingdom: Fungi
- Division: Mucoromycota
- Class: Mucoromycetes
- Order: Mucorales
- Family: Mucoraceae
- Genus: Mucor
- Species: M. silvaticus

Binomial name
- Mucor silvaticus Hagem

Synonyms
- Mucor hiemalis f. silvaticus (Hagem) Schipper

Species of fungus

Mucor silvaticus is a fungal plant pathogen.
