= Mucor amphibiorum =

Scientific classification
- Kingdom: Fungi
- Division: Mucoromycota
- Class: Mucoromycetes
- Order: Mucorales
- Family: Mucoraceae
- Genus: Mucor
- Species: M. amphibiorum

Binomial name
- Mucor amphibiorum Schipper

Species of fungus

Mucor amphibiorum is a fungus found in Australia that causes infections in amphibians and platypuses. Because M. amphibiorum belongs to the genus Mucor, the infection is classified as a form of mucormycosis. The fungus was first reported from a German zoo in 1972 where it caused disease in a species of green tree frog that was imported from Australia and infected frogs, toads, and salamanders in neighboring exhibits. It is most commonly found in frogs and toads in Queensland, New South Wales, and Northern Territory, and in platypuses in Tasmania.

== Morphology ==
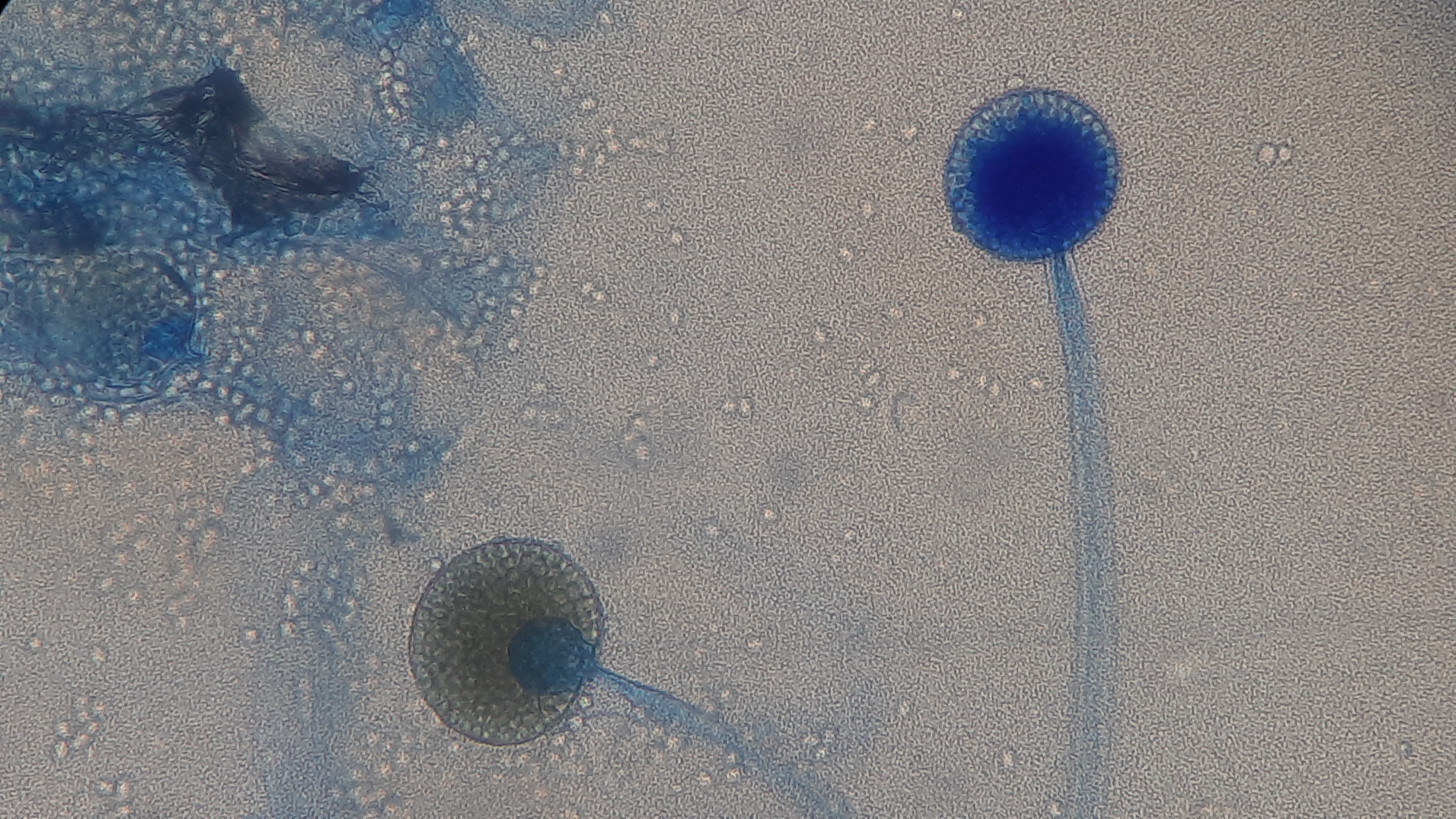
Sporangiophore, sporangium, and spores of Mucor specimen.

Colonies grow up to 25 mm in height, are grayish brown, slightly aromatic, and will not grow at temperatures of 37 °Celsius. Sporangiophores are unbranched, or rarely sympodially branched. Sporangia are dark brown and up to 75 μm in diameter. Sporangiospores are globose, smooth walled, and 3.4 – 5.4 μm in diameter. Zygospores are globose or slightly compressed and 60 – 70 μm in diameter.
