= Mucor hiemalis =

Scientific classification
- Domain: Eukaryota
- Kingdom: Fungi
- Division: Mucoromycota
- Class: Mucoromycetes
- Order: Mucorales
- Family: Mucoraceae
- Genus: Mucor
- Species: M. hiemalis

Binomial name
- Mucor hiemalis Wehmer, (1903)

Species of fungus

Mucor hiemalis is among the zygosporic fungi found in unspoiled foods. It has different industrial importance as biotransforming agents of pharmacological and chemical compounds.

== Morphology and cell structure ==
Mucor hiemalis grows in expanding gray colonies. It grows branched sporangiophores that yielding yellow to dark brown sporangia which can mate to form black-brown, spiny zygospores.

== Physiology ==
Mucor hiemalis is nitrate positive and requires thiamin to grow.
