= Mucor fragilis =

Scientific classification
- Domain: Eukaryota
- Kingdom: Fungi
- Division: Mucoromycota
- Class: Mucoromycetes
- Order: Mucorales
- Family: Mucoraceae
- Genus: Mucor
- Species: M. fragilis

Binomial name
- Mucor fragilis Bainier, 1884

Species of fungi

Mucor fragilis is an endophytic fungus that causes the mold that can be found on grapes, pole beans, loquat, and on the roots of medicinal plants like Radix pseudostellariae. It belongs to the order Mucorales and phylum Mucoromycota. The observed symptoms showed the presence of fluffy and soft fungal mycelium with white to dark brown discoloration that deteriorated the beans and grapes quality.

== Taxonomy ==
Mucor fragilis was described by Bainier in 1884.

== Description ==
Mucor fragilis is described to have colonies that vary in color from white and reverse white to light gray. Mucor fragilis reproduces asexually and the sporangiophores are found as two types: simple and sympodially branched. Sporangiophores are mostly sympodially branched and grow to a width of around 6–12 μm and have a variable length. These sporangiophores have globose to subglobose, multispored, light yellow sporangia on them that measure around 24.5–49.5 by 22.5–48 μm. The columellae of Mucor fragilis can be globose to ellipsoid, pyriform, or some conical and can measure around 17.5–30 by 16–29.5 μm. The columellae collar is evident.

== Habitat and distribution ==
This species is isolated from soil, insects, fruits, honeycomb, limestone, and plasticized polyvinyl chloride. It is distributed worldwide in places like Australia, Brazil, Bulgaria, China, Czech Republic, Germany, Greece, India, Iran, Kenya, Korea, Lithuania, Mexico, Pakistan, Poland, Portugal, Spain, Switzerland, and the United States. It is known in 3 of the 26 states in Brazil.

== Ecology ==
Mucor fragilis is causing rot on lots of plant species in China and Pakistan. It has been found on grapes in five different locations of fruit markets after harvest in Pakistan and has causes a decline in the market value of grapes. Thyme oil has been found to potentially increase the shelf-life of these grapes. Also in Pakistan, Mucor fragilis has been causing rot in seychelles pole beans. This is the first time this fungus has been seen on pole beans and is causing urgency to control this fungus so it does not spread. In China, Mucor fragilis has been found on one of China's highly prized medicinal plants (Radix pseudostellariae). This is also the first report of Mucor fragilis causing rot on this plant and could result in loss of production of this medical plant. Mucor fragilis was found on deceased adult reproductive female brown widow spiders (Latrodectus geometricus) in North Central Florida. Spiders first showed signs of reduced foraging behavior and then started to die, this confirms that Mucor fragilis is pathogenic to these spiders. Mucor fragilis releases spores that can infect species like these spiders in multiple ways such as in their food or wound exposure. A study done on enzymes from Mucor fragilis grown on bovine blood provides a discussion on how this fungus be helpful to study structures on glycoconjugates containing certain glycoproteins. The view is that blood has nutritional value and is wasted when producing meat and the goal was to find a way to reuse this biomass and with a little more research, enzymes of Mucor fragilis may be the answer to the problem.

== Bioactive metabolites ==
Mucor fragilis can produce simultaneously two bioactive metabolites, podophyllotoxin and kaempferol, as its host plant. This is very significant for this fungus as podophyllotoxin is in great demand due to its use as an anticancer and antivirus drug precursor. As the podophyllum plant is endangered, having Mucor fragilis produce podophyllotoxin can help increase the production of podophyllotoxin and also help the endangered podophyllum plant from going extinct. Mucor fragilis is an effective endophytic fungal elicitor as it has shown enhancement features of some primary and secondary metabolites in Salvia miltiorrhiza hairy roots.
