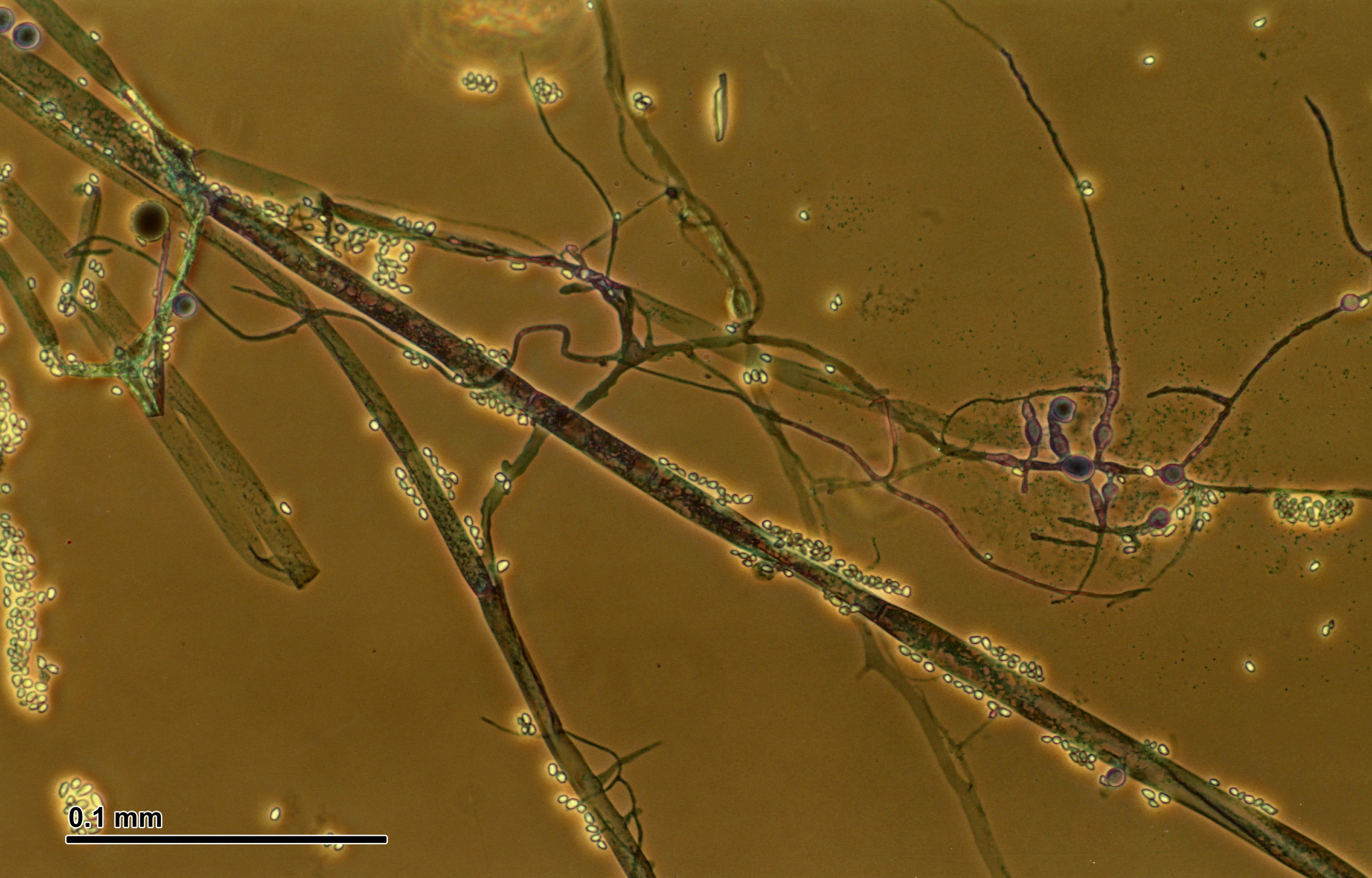

Scientific classification
- Kingdom: Fungi
- Division: Mucoromycota
- Class: Mucoromycetes
- Order: Mucorales
- Family: Mucoraceae
- Genus: Thamnidium; Link (1809)

Species
- Thamnidium anomalum Thamnidium ctenidium Thamnidium elegans

= Thamnidium =

Genus of fungi

Thamnidium is a genus of fungi belonging to the family Mucoraceae.

The genus was circumscribed in 1809 by Johann Heinrich Friedrich Link.

Thamnidium molds are key participants in the aging process for dry aged beef, producing protease and collagenase enzymes that naturally tenderize the meat. Thamnidium forms pale grey patches of mold called 'whiskers' on fatty areas of a carcass or cut during the aging process.

The genus has also been implicated in the spoiling of meat in cold storage, alongside other fungal genera such as Acremonium, Mucor and Rhizopus.
