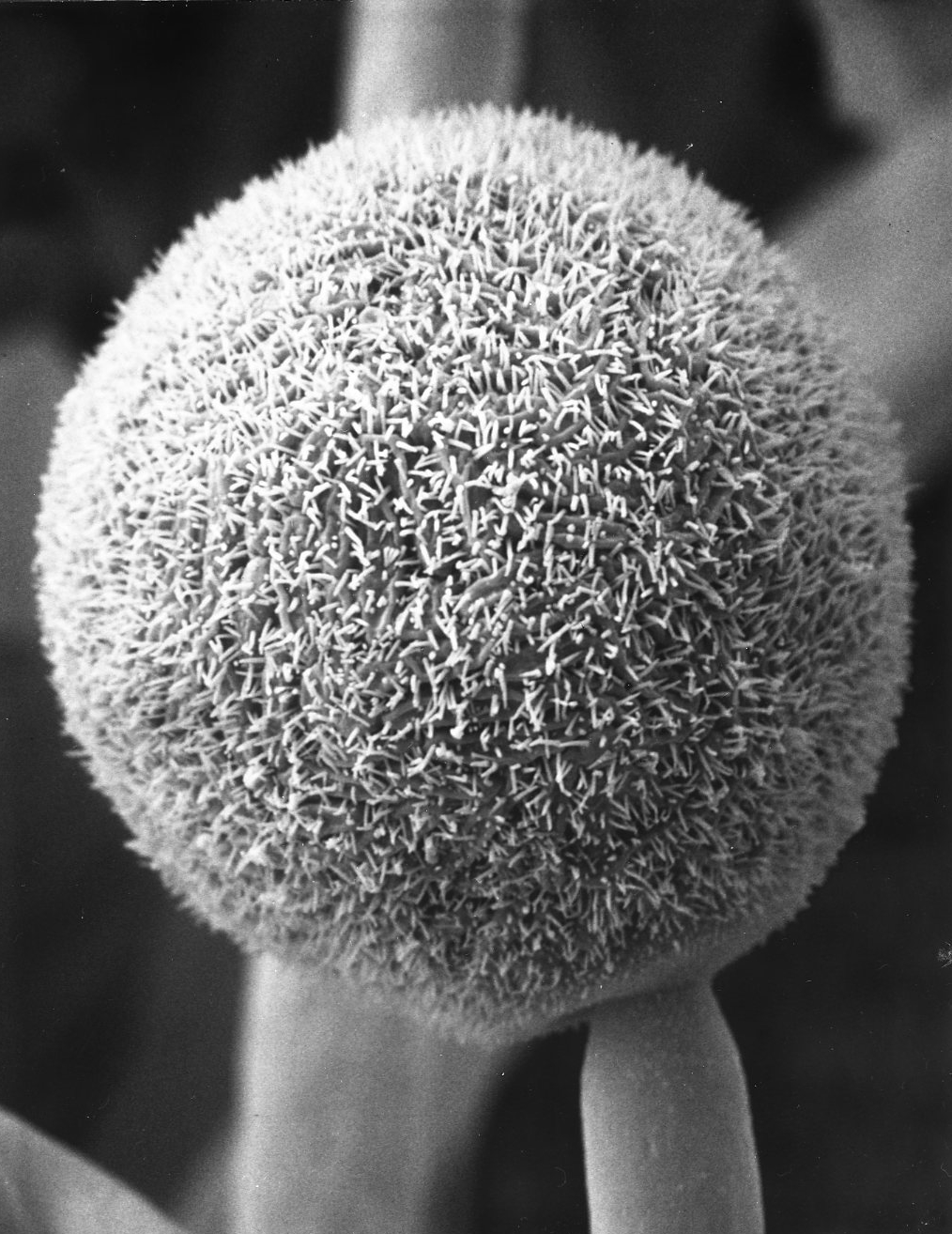
- Helicostylum pulchrum

Scientific classification
- Kingdom: Fungi
- Division: Mucoromycota
- Class: Mucoromycetes
- Order: Mucorales
- Family: Mucoraceae
- Genus: Helicostylum; Corda (1842)

Species
- Helicostylum elegans; Helicostylum pulchrum

= Helicostylum =

Genus of fungi

Helicostylum is a genus of fungi in the family Mucoraceae. It currently contains two species.
