= Mike Gatto =

American politician

Mike Gatto OSSML
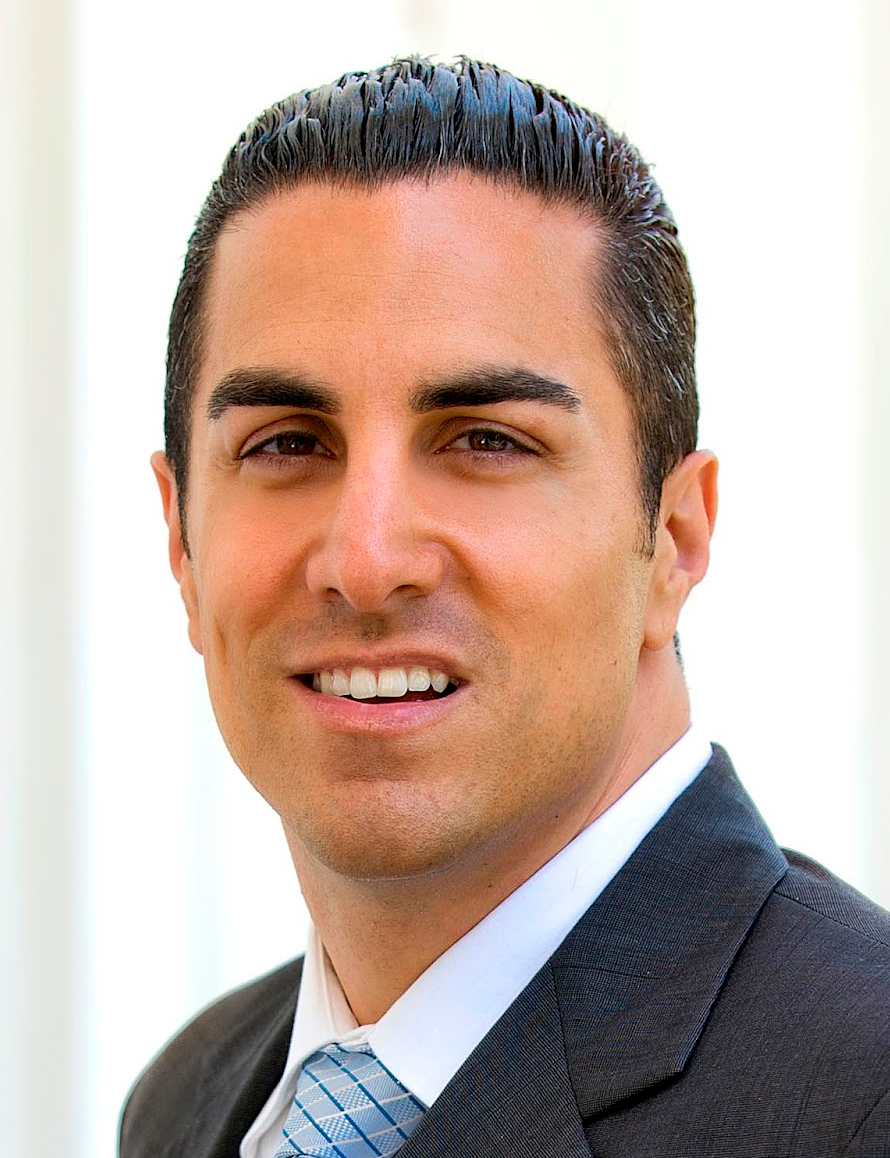

Member of the California State Assembly from the 43rd district
- In office June 10, 2010 – November 30, 2016
- Preceded by: Paul Krekorian
- Succeeded by: Laura Friedman

Personal details
- Born: October 19, 1974 (age 51) Los Angeles, California
- Party: Democratic
- Children: 3
- Education: University of California, Los Angeles (B.A.); Loyola Marymount University (J.D.)
- Website: mikegatto.com

Michael Anthony Gatto OSSML (born October 19, 1974) is an American politician, who served in the California State Assembly from 2010 to 2016. A member of the Democratic Party, data analyses of the voting records conducted by the Sacramento Bee newspaper concluded that Gatto was one of the most independent state lawmakers.

After being elected to the California State Assembly in a special election, he served as Assistant Speaker Pro Tempore, Chairman of the Appropriations Committee, Chairman of the Consumer Protection & Privacy Committee, and Chairman of the Utilities & Commerce Committee. The author of several pieces of notable legislation, Gatto is perhaps best known for authoring and passing the first California Rainy Day Fund, a constitutional amendment to force the state to put away money during fiscally positive times, which California Governor Jerry Brown subsequently adopted as his own. In October 2019, Gatto authored a statewide ballot initiative to comprehensively address the state's homelessness crisis. In March 2022, California Governor Gavin Newsom adopted the same principles in Gatto's proposal.

== Early life, education, and previous career ==
Gatto grew up in the Franklin Hills and Silver Lake neighborhoods of Los Angeles. His grandfather was an immigrant coal miner. Gatto is a lifelong Roman Catholic.

Gatto earned a Bachelor of Arts degree from the University of California, Los Angeles in 1996 and a J.D. from Loyola Law School, graduating magna cum laude from the latter in 2004. For five years, he worked as a top aide to Congressman Brad Sherman. Gatto also served in the administrations of three successive mayors of Los Angeles as President of the El Pueblo (Los Angeles Historical Monument Authority) Commission.

== California State Assembly ==
=== Elections ===
Gatto won three elections in seven weeks in 2010, and was sworn into the Assembly in mid-June. During the election, Gatto secured the endorsement of the Los Angeles Daily News, which wrote that Gatto was "fiscally minded and intelligent... the kind of legislator California needs."

Gatto's 43rd Assembly District included Burbank, Glendale, La Crescenta, La Canada Flintridge, and the Los Angeles communities of Atwater Village, Franklin Hills, Los Feliz, Silver Lake, the Hollywood Hills, and half of Hollywood.

==== 2014 California State Assembly ====
California's 43rd State Assembly district election, 2014
Primary election
Party	Candidate	Votes	%
Democratic	Mike Gatto (incumbent)	28,354	67.0
Republican	Todd Royal	13,985	33.0
Total votes		42,339	100.0
General election
Democratic	Mike Gatto (incumbent)	51,971	66.5
Republican	Todd Royal	26,192	33.5
Total votes		78,163	100.0
Democratic hold			

=== Tenure ===
Gatto had the best attendance record in the legislature, and one of the longest streaks of not missing a vote for any legislator nationwide. In the 2013-2014 session, Gatto had the only perfect attendance record in the California legislature, not missing one of the Assembly's 5,897 votes.

In 2010, Gatto introduced legislation to reduce municipal pension costs. His bill sought to cap the exposure of well-managed cities when less frugal (or corrupt) municipalities offered top officials excessive salaries.

In October 2010, Gatto authored ACA 4, the Rainy Day Fund (or "savings account") for the State of California. The constitutional amendment mandated that the legislature, during years of strong revenues, follow a strict program limiting expenditures. First, the state would have to fulfill all obligations to education, then deposit up to 10% of general fund revenues into a savings account, to be used during years of weak revenue. After that, the state would be mandated to pay down bond debt. Gatto's Rainy Day Fund legislation passed both houses of the legislature and was approved by Governor Arnold Schwarzenegger.

In the 2011-2012 session, Gatto served as Assistant Speaker Pro Tempore of the California Assembly.

One of Gatto's bills in 2011 would have required the state to study embedding piezoelectric sensors in state highways, which produce electrical energy by the vibrations vehicles make as they traverse the pavement.

Gatto also authored AB 1900 and 2196, which created the modern renewable fuels industry in California. Those pieces of legislation allowed, and set the framework for, farmers to turn cow dung and landfills to turn decomposing yard clippings into an ultra-clean transportation fuel, thereby creating a major renewable-energy market in California.

Gatto authored the California Homemade Food Act to allow small startup businesses to produce certain food products without the regulations for large commercial operators applying to them. The Act was noted by KCRA as being beneficial to small businesspeople in the food-production sector. Forbes stated the measure "created over a thousand local businesses."

In August 2012, Gatto was appointed chair of the assembly's powerful Appropriations Committee.

In September 2012, Gatto introduced a bill requiring the California DMV to establish the California Legacy License Plate Program, bringing back replicas of black license plates issued in California in the 1960s.

Gatto's 2013 legislation included a bill to forbid cities from writing tickets to motorists who park at broken parking meters that a city has failed to repair. He also authored legislation which would give small businesses a safe harbor for correcting deficiencies in Proposition 65 warnings without being subject to financial penalties and lawsuits, the first substantive Prop. 65 reform ever. Gatto also authored legislation to make better use of carpool lanes during off-peak hours.

In mid-2013, Gatto pushed for an audit of the Child Protective Services departments in the state of California, based on the concern that they were not spotting child abuse fast enough.

In 2014, Gatto introduced a landmark federal constitutional amendment to force Congress to address campaign-finance reform. He introduced a number of measures to address hit-and-run crashes. Gatto also introduced measures to curb child abuse at elementary schools, and to address the problem of sexual assaults on college campuses.

In 2014, Gatto also authored and got signed into law significant legislation to keep film and television production jobs in California.

Two measures of Gatto's in 2014 were novel for government. One was a "Wiki-bill", using a Wikipedia-like platform to allow the public to draft legislation in the open. The other was a "Government X-Prize, whereby members of the public could win awards for providing the government with intellectual property (patents or plans) to make government processes more efficient.

Gatto was the lead Los Angeles negotiator for the California Water Bond of 2014, securing just under a billion dollars for the Los Angeles region to clean up polluted groundwater reservoirs, which were still full despite the California drought, so that the region did not need to import so much water from elsewhere.

As the end of 2014, Gatto was awarded the Medal of Mkhitar Gosh, "for outstanding state and social-political activities, as well as for significant services in the spheres of diplomacy, law, and political science."

In 2015, Gatto introduced a variety of groundbreaking consumer-privacy legislation. He introduced a bill to restrict the ability of government to store indefinitely the blood and DNA of newborn children and to crack down on government selling the blood to for-profit researchers for experimentation without the knowledge of parents. He teamed up with Kerri Kasem, daughter of Casey Kasem, to author a bill allowing adult children of seniors to obtain visitation rights for their loved ones. With Jerry Hill, he authored SB 34, which cracked down on government monitoring of citizens using automatic number-plate recognition.

Also in 2015, Gatto authored a major probate reform bill that allows homeowners to pass their property to loved ones without hiring a lawyer, paying to create a trust, or facing the cost and bureaucracy of probate. Of this bill, the Howard Jarvis Taxpayers Association said, "Other than Proposition 13, there is no greater bill that we support for this year."

In December 2015, Gatto was named Chairman of the Utilities and Commerce Committee, and immediately announced an investigation into the Aliso Canyon gas leak. After a number of scandals rocked the California Public Utilities Commission, Gatto introduced a constitutional amendment to break up the agency.

After his tenure concluded, Assembly Speaker Anthony Rendon appointed Gatto to the Delta Stewardship Council, an entity that handles water-supply and environmental issues pertaining to rivers.

Gatto has continued to propose legislation after his tenure concluded. In October 2019, Gatto authored a statewide ballot initiative to address California's homelessness crisis. California Governor Gavin Newsom adopted many of the same principles in Gatto's proposal, as did one of Newsom's electoral opponents, Michael Shellenberger.

== Recognition ==
In 2013, Gatto earned the Robert F. Kennedy Leadership Award from the San Fernando Valley Young Democrats.

Gatto has been published in several publications on the topic of monetary and fiscal policy, and their effect on income inequality and wealth disparity.

He was an early commenter on how the government's COVID-19 policies violated constitutional rights.

In 2024, Gatto served as spokesman for Proposition 36, which aims to halt fentanyl trafficking and serial retail theft, and increase the ability for judges to get people into rehab.

== Personal life ==
Gatto is married to Danielle Gatto. They have two young daughters and a son. He is a cousin to astronaut Mario Runco Jr. Gatto was raised and is a practicing Roman Catholic.

On November 12, 2013, Gatto's father, Joseph Gatto was murdered in a home-invasion robbery at his home in Silver Lake, Los Angeles, California, at the age of 78. The crime is unsolved. In 2024, Gatto's book about the case was published by Black Rose Writing.

== Bibliography ==
- Noir by Necessity: How My Father's Unsolved Murder Took Me to Dark Places (2024)
