= Beef aging =

Process of preparing beef for consumption

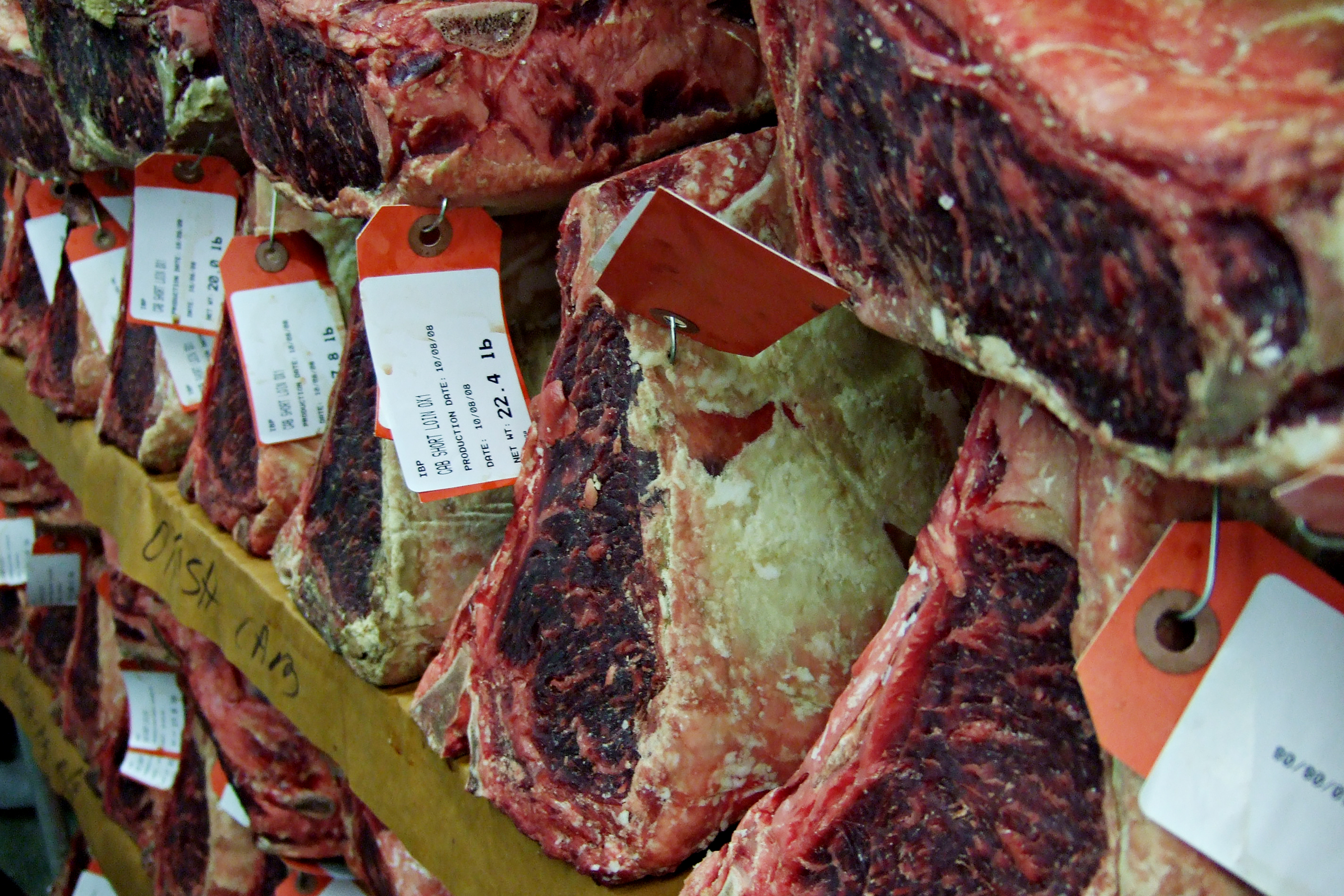
Beef being dry aged

Beef aging or beef ageing is a process of preparing beef for consumption by aging it, in order to break down the connective tissue within the meat.

== Dry-aged beef ==
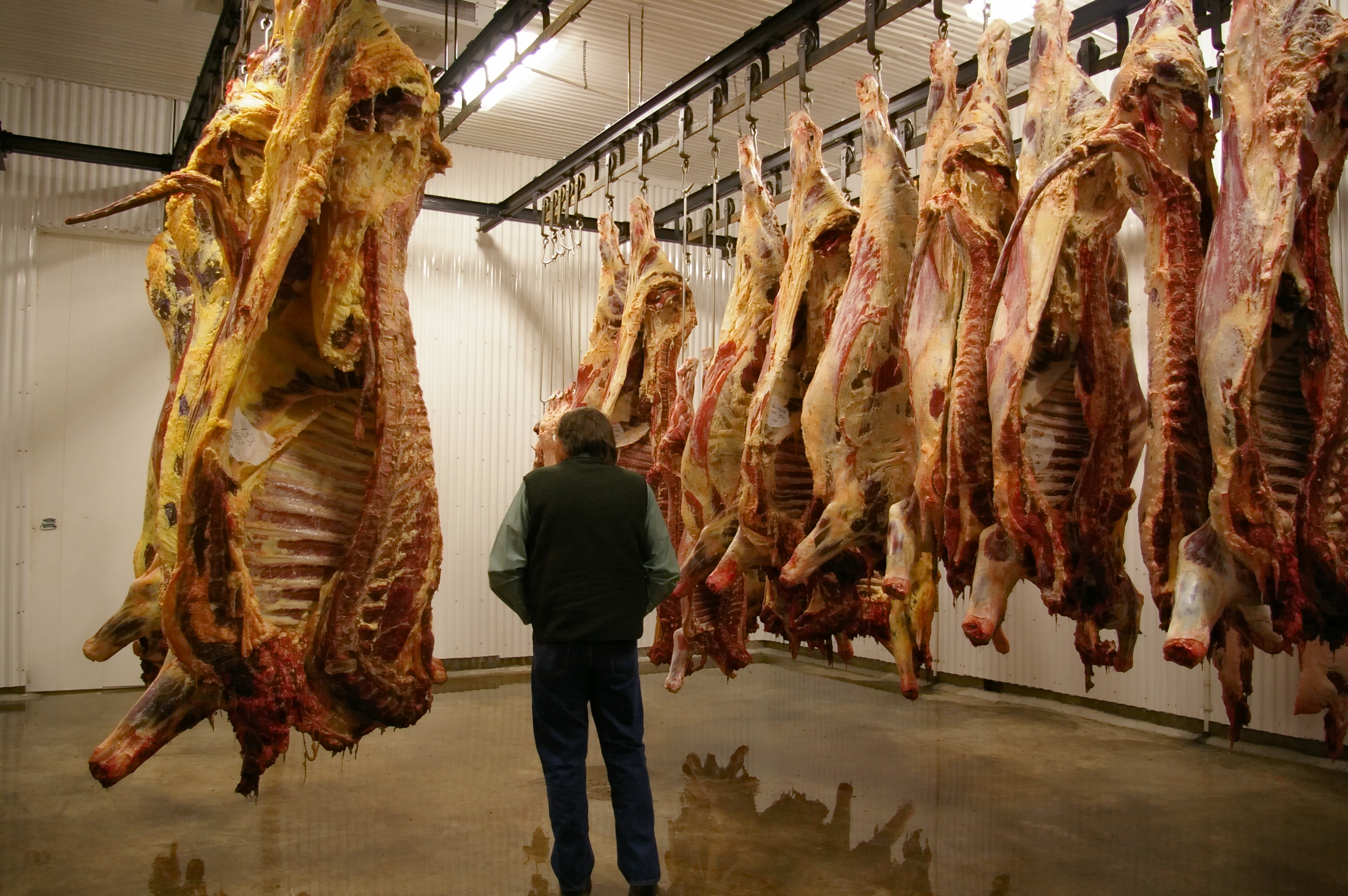
Hanging beef

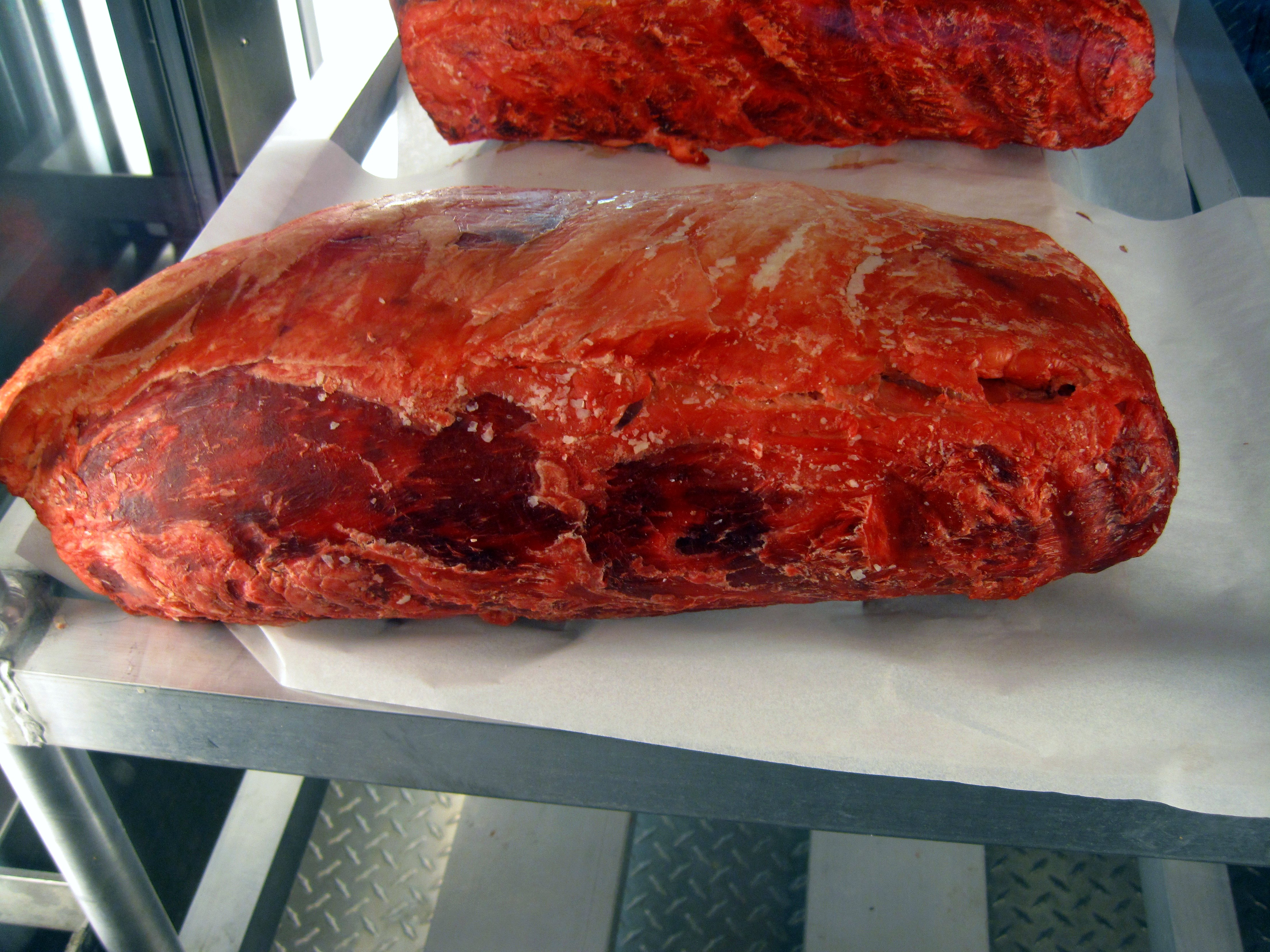
Dry aging beef at a steakhouse

Dry-aged beef is beef that has been hung or placed on a rack to dry for several weeks. After the animal is slaughtered and cleaned, it is hung as a full or half carcass. Primal (large distinct sections) or sub primal cuts, such as strip loins, rib eyes, and sirloin, are placed in a refrigerator unit, also known as a "hot box". This process involves considerable expense, as the beef must be stored near freezing temperatures. Subprimal cuts can be dry aged on racks either in specially climate-controlled coolers or within a moisture-permeable drybag. Moreover, only the higher grades of meat can be dry aged, as the process requires meat with a large, evenly distributed fat content. Because of this, dry-aged beef is seldom available outside of steak restaurants and upscale butcher shops or groceries. The key effect of dry aging is the concentration and saturation of the natural flavour, as well as the tenderization of the meat texture.

The process changes beef by two means. Firstly, moisture is evaporated from the muscle. The resulting process of desiccation creates a greater concentration of beef flavour and taste. Secondly, the beef's natural enzymes break down the connective tissue in the muscle, which leads to more tender beef.

The process of dry-aging usually also promotes growth of certain fungal (mold) species on the external surface of the meat. This does not cause spoilage, but rather forms an external "crust" on the meat's surface, which is trimmed off when the meat is prepared for cooking. These fungal species complement the natural enzymes in the beef by helping to tenderize and increase the flavor of the meat. The genus Thamnidium, in particular, is known to produce collagenolytic enzymes which greatly contribute to the tenderness and flavor of dry-aged meat.

Dry-aged beef is typically not sold by most supermarkets in the U.S. today, because it takes time, the meat loses weight, and there is a risk of spoilage. Dry-aging can take from 15 to 28 days, and typically up to a third or more of the weight is lost as moisture. This type of beef is served in higher-priced steakhouses and by select restaurants.

Dry-aging can be done at home under refrigeration by three means: open air, with the presence of salt blocks, and with the use of a moisture permeable drybag to protect the meat while it is aging. Since the mid-2010s, some chefs have experimented with a "quick" or "cheat" dry-age by coating a cut of beef with ground koji (rice inoculated with Aspergillus oryzae, traditionally used to ferment savory sauces) to simulate the effect of traditional dry-aging; the results are not quite the same, but can be achieved within 48 to 72 hours. The koji technique can also be applied to chicken and shrimp.

When dry aging using a moisture-permeable material, surface mold growth is not present, flavor and scent exchange within the refrigerated environment is not a concern, and trim loss of the outer hardened surface is measurably reduced. The flavor and texture profile of the beef is similar on all dimensions to the traditional open air dry-aged results.

Historically, it was common to store mutton or beef joints at room temperature for extended periods. However, after the invention of refrigeration, hanging sides of beef in large coolers for a few weeks as part of the processing became the standard.

== Wet-aged beef ==
Wet-aged beef is beef that has typically been aged in a vacuum-sealed bag to retain its moisture. Since the 1970s, with the development of vacuum packing machines and related technology, this has become the dominant mode of aging beef in the US and UK. It is popular with producers, wholesalers and retailers because it takes less time: typically only a few days and there is no moisture loss, so any given piece of meat sold by weight will have a higher value than a dry aged piece where moisture loss is desired for taste at the expense of final weight. The beef is usually kept for a period of 4 to 10 days in wet aging. Modified-atmosphere packaging (MAP) is usually employed for the vacuum packaging of meat; typically between 60 and 80 percent oxygen to retain its appetizing color, with red meat such as beef needing a higher oxygen level than less vividly colored meat such as pork. The vacuum packed beef is stored at a temperature of 32 to 45 °F (0 to 7 °C).

== See also ==
- Ham, especially country ham: pork aging, Bacon
- Meat hanging
