= Mucor velutinosus =

Scientific classification
- Domain: Eukaryota
- Kingdom: Fungi
- Division: Mucoromycota
- Class: Mucoromycetes
- Order: Mucorales
- Family: Mucoraceae
- Genus: Mucor
- Species: M. velutinosus

Binomial name
- Mucor velutinosus Álvarez et al., 2010

Species of fungus

Mucor velutinosus is a fungus first isolated from human clinical specimens in the US. It is closely related to Mucor ramosissimus, but differs in its ability to grow at 37 °C and produce verrucose sporangiospores.
