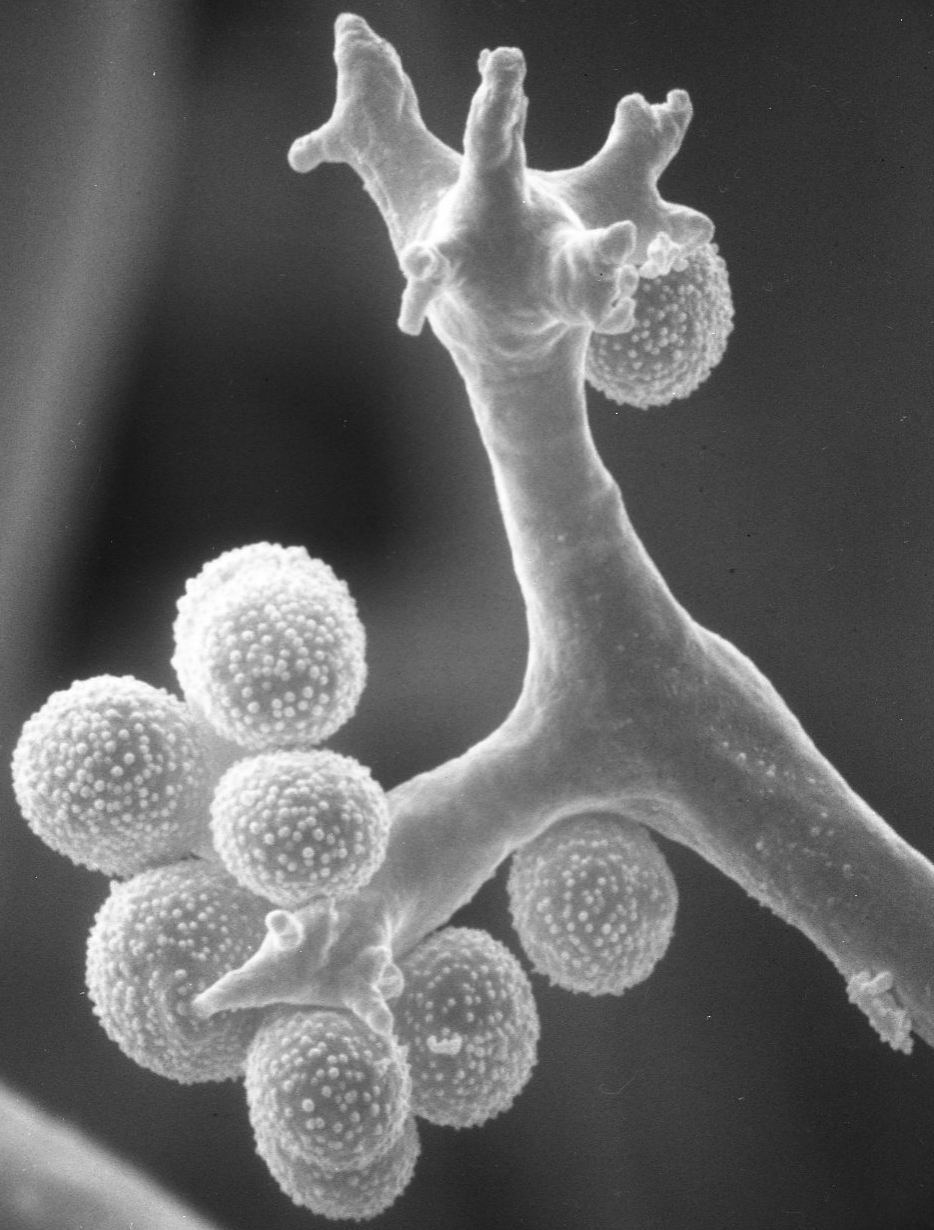
- Chaetocladium brefeldii

Scientific classification
- Kingdom: Fungi
- Division: Mucoromycota
- Class: Mucoromycetes
- Order: Mucorales
- Family: Mucoraceae
- Genus: Chaetocladium; Fresen. 1863

Species
- Chaetocladium brefeldii; Chaetocladium elegans Zopf 1890; Chaetocladium jonesii

= Chaetocladium =

Genus of fungi

Chaetocladium is a genus of fungi in the family Mucoraceae.
