= Mucor piriformis =

Scientific classification
- Domain: Eukaryota
- Kingdom: Fungi
- Division: Mucoromycota
- Class: Mucoromycetes
- Order: Mucorales
- Family: Mucoraceae
- Genus: Mucor
- Species: M. piriformis

Binomial name
- Mucor piriformis Scop., (1772)

Species of fungus

Mucor piriformis is a plant pathogen that causes a soft rot of several fruits known as Mucor rot. Infection of its host fruits, such as apples and pears, takes place post-harvest. The fungi can also infect citrus fruits.
