= Mucor indicus =

Scientific classification
- Domain: Eukaryota
- Kingdom: Fungi
- Division: Mucoromycota
- Class: Mucoromycetes
- Order: Mucorales
- Family: Mucoraceae
- Genus: Mucor
- Species: M. indicus

Binomial name
- Mucor indicus Lendn.

Species of fungus

Mucor indicus is among the most important members of zygomycetes fungi. This dimorphic fungus is capable of production of several valuable products. Some strains of the fungus have been isolated from the traditional Indonesian food tempeh. M. indicus is nowadays used for production of several homemade food and beverages especially in Asia. This has also been successfully used as a safe nutritional source for fish and rat. The fungus is generally regarded as safe though there are few reports claiming that this is a pathogenic fungus.

The capability of the fungus in production of ethanol is comparable with that of Saccharomyces cerevisiae. Unlike S. cerevisiae, M. indicus ferments pentoses as well as hexoses and therefore this can be used for production of ethanol from lignocellulosic materials.

The cell wall of the fungus contains considerable amounts of chitosan. Moreover, the fungus is classified as an oil producing fungus. Hence, the biomass of the fungus is considered as a rich source for production of chitosan and polyunsaturated fatty acids especially γ-linolenic acid (Omega-6).

The autolysate of the fungus has a high nutritional value and can replace yeast extract in microbial cultivations.
