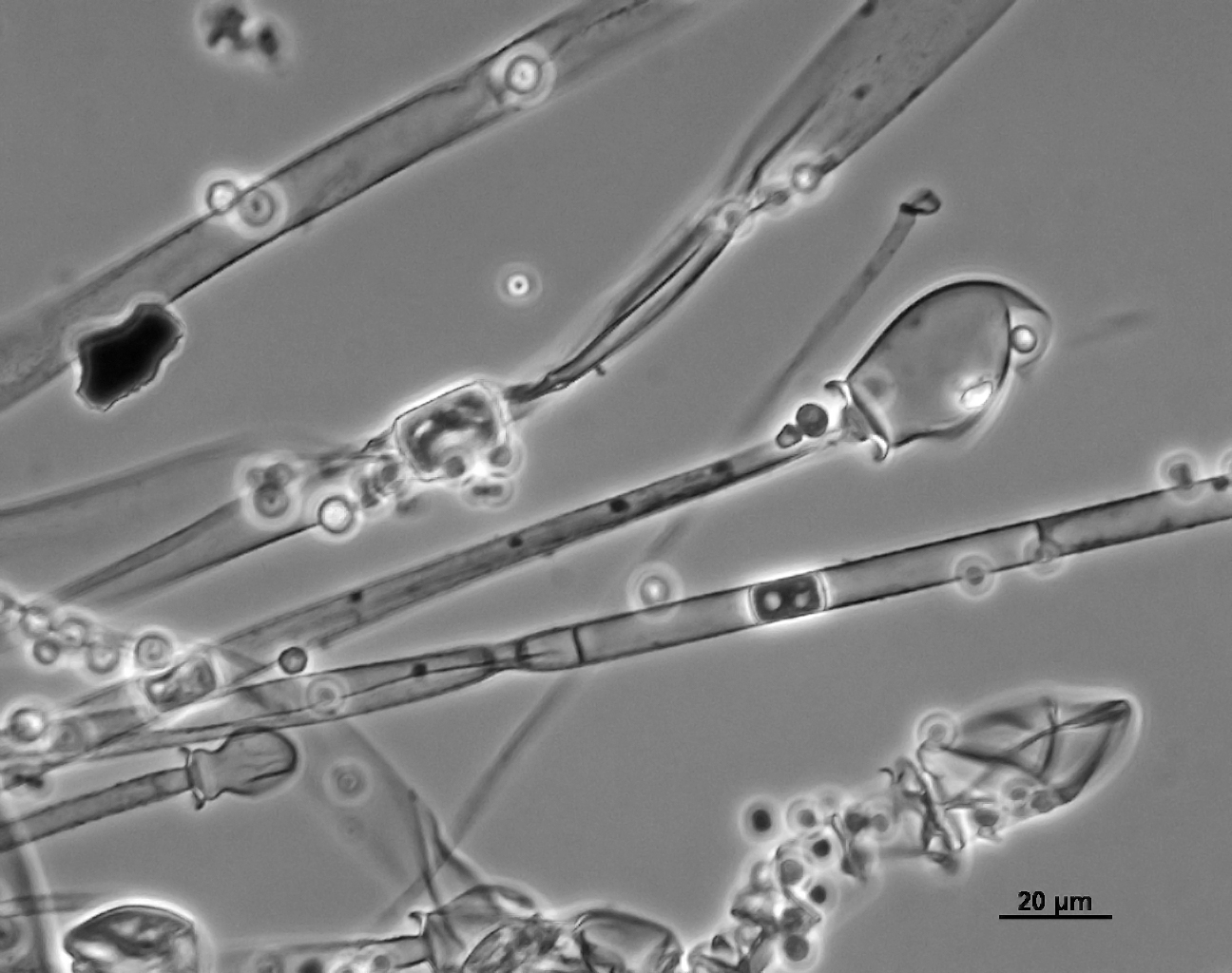

Scientific classification
- Kingdom: Fungi
- Division: Mucoromycota
- Class: Mucoromycetes
- Order: Mucorales
- Family: Mucoraceae
- Genus: Mucor
- Species: M. racemosus

Binomial name
- Mucor racemosus Bull. (1791)

Synonyms
- Calyptromyces globosus Sumst. (1910); Circinomucor sphaerosporus Arx (1982); Mucor dimorphosporus f. sphaerosporus Vánová (1991); Mucor globosus A. Fisch. (1892); Mucor globosus var. intermedius Sacc. (1913); Mucor macrosporus Pišpek (1929); Mucor plumbeus var. globosus Zach (1935); Mucor plumbeus var. levisporus Zach (1936); Mucor pyri M.P. English (1943); Mucor sphaerosporus Hagem (1908); Mucor sphaerosporus var. major Naumov (1954)

= Mucor racemosus =

Species of fungus

Mucor racemosus is a rapidly growing, weedy mould belonging to the division Mucoromycota. It is one of the earliest fungi to be grown in pure culture and was first isolated in 1886. It has a worldwide distribution and colonizes many habitats such as vegetational products, soil and houses. The fungus is mostly known for its ability to exhibit both filamentous and yeast-like morphologies, often referred to as dimorphism. Stark differences are seen in both forms and conditions of the environment heavily affect the phases of the M. racemosus. Like many fungi, it also reproduces both sexually and asexually. The dimorphic capacity of this species has been proposed as an important factor in its pathogenicity and has enhanced the industrial importance. This species is considered an opportunistic pathogen, generally limited to immunocompromised individuals. It has also been associated with allergy and inflammations of facial sinuses. Its association with allergy has made it a common fungus used in allergen medical testing. Industrial use of the fungus is in the production of enzymes and the manufacture of certain dairy foods.

== Morphology ==
The dimorphic form of the species mainly exists and grows vegetatively as either a filamentous hyphae (mould form) or as spherical yeast (yeast form). However, the organism is best known from the mould form which is characterised by the production of asexual reproductive state consisting of tall (up to 2 cm) needle-like sporangiophores with an apical swelling enclosed by a large sporangium filled with ellipsoidal, single-celled, smooth-walled, unpigmented sporangiospores. In the laboratory, the fungus forms dark grey or light grey colonies on most common laboratory media. If subjected to anaerobic conditions, the fungus may convert to the yeast-like form. Anaerobic conditions and 30% carbon dioxide presence stimulate conversion to yeast form. Likewise, cultures supplemented with Tween 80, ergosterol and supplied with 100% nitrogen also converted to yeast. Conversely, increasing oxygen concentration will cause conversion of the yeast form to the mould form. Like many zygomycetes, M. racemosus reproduces both sexually and asexually depending on environmental conditions. During sexual reproduction, hyphae of compatible mating types touch and fuse, ultimately giving rise to a thick-walled zygosporangium containing a single zygospore. Germination from the zygospore leads to growth of new hyphae that give rise to asexual spores of both + and - mating type. Germination of these spores produces new haploid hyphae of the same mating type.

== Physiology and ecology ==
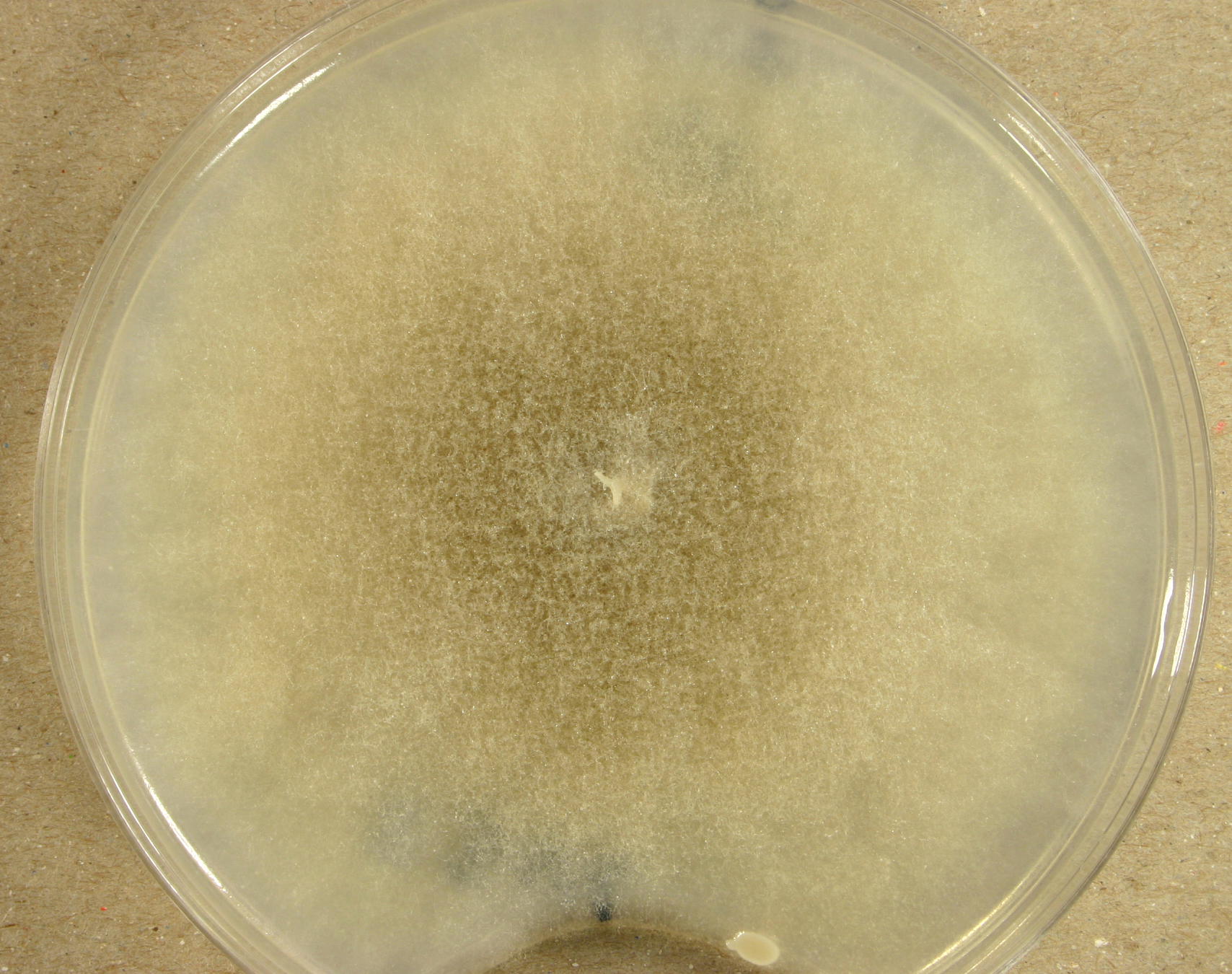
Mucor racemosus (UAMH 8346) cultured on potato dextrose agar at 25 °C for 10 days.

M. racemosus possesses the ability to exhibit multiple morphology (mainly, filamentous and spherical shape) to withstand various environmental stress. This has given it ability to survive many conditions and it has a worldwide distribution, reported most frequently in Europe as well as Americas. In the tropics, it has been seen at higher altitudes. While the species is primarily soil-based, it has been shown to exist elsewhere such as in horse manure, plant remains, grains, vegetables and nuts. Typically, it is often seen on plant-based materials such as soft fruit, fruit juice and marmalade but it has also been isolated from non-plant sources like soft camembert cheese. M. racemosus has also been isolated from the human gut microbiome of non-obese individuals. It is the most common mould found in the floor dust in houses and is largely considered as an indoor mould. M. racemosus is uniquely known for its ability to display multiple morphologies but most of the time, studies are made based on the dimorphic form of the species. It is a facultative anaerobic zygomycote and fast-growing, conferring it ability to survive in multiple conditions/locations all over the world. M. racemosus possesses the ability to biosynthesize chitin and chitosan, which has been proposed as a mechanism supporting the ability of the fungus to switch between the yeast and the mould phases. Genomic analysis of M. racemosus has revealed genes similar to human RAS genes, and it is proposed that these genes help with germination and dimorphism. Protein kinase A (PKA) genes such as pkaR are highly also expressed during dimorphic shift.

== Human disease ==
Mucor racemosus is a rare agent of human disease, typically only associated with opportunistic infection of immunocompromised individuals such as children, elderly and diseased patients (HIV, Ebola etc.). It is an agent of Mucormycosis, a potentially life-threatening infection often involving the head airways. Pulmonary, cutaneous, and gastrointestinal (GI) infections have also been observed leading to an array of clinical presentations in infected individuals. Risk factors such as diabetic ketoacidosis and neutropenia are present in most cases. Treatment of M. racemosus can be difficult due to histopathologic differentiation of the fungus. In addition to commonly used antifungal agents, biological compounds like Lovastatin, Aleuria aurantia lectin (AAL) and antimicrobial peptides (AMPs LR14) have been isolated and showed antimicrobial effects towards M. racemosus. Allergies to M. racemosus have been reported to affect immunologically normal individuals from in a range of places (Netherlands, Turkey and Brazil). Allergy to M. racemosus has been also associated with fungal rhinosinusitis, rhinitis and extrinsic allergic alveolitis. Asthmatic patients have also shown elevated sensitization to M. racemosus. Mucor racemosus-specific IgE antibody is commonly used and available for medical as well as laboratory use in allergen assay (ImmunoCAP).

== Commercial and biotechnological use ==
The capacity of M. racemosus to grow as a yeast and its various abilities to manufacture biochemicals have led to its use in industry. For example, it can produce a high yield of phytase, an important industrial enzyme. It also has an increased extracellular protease activity, suggesting its biotechnological suitability for the production of other industrial enzymes. In the manufacture of sufu (fermented cheese-like soybean product common in China and Vietnam), the fungal fermentation of soybean curd (tofu) results in moulded tofu, pehtze. The final product (sufu) is obtained by maturing pehtze in a brine containing alcohol and salt for several months.

It possesses the ability to adapt phenotypically to several different antibiotics after exposure to a single drug, which makes it a good model for phenotypic multidrug resistance in lower eukaryotes. It has been shown to adapt to famous antibiotics like cycloheximide, trichodermin and amphotericin B. Cells adapted to cycloheximide particularly have been observed to be 40-times more resistant than non-adapted cells to the drug. These adapted cells have been studied to better understand their greater efficiency of membrane transport (efflux of drugs).

Mucor racemosus can biotransform lipids like 4-ene-3-one steroids and 20(S)-Protopanaxatriol into several different products, some of which have anticancer properties (as the metabolites resulted in increased intracellular calcium ion content, leading to cell cycle arrest and apoptosis). Two of the products formed from this biotransformation are two novel hydroperoxylated metabolites that have been shown to be effective against prostate cancer cells. Secondary metabolites of M. racemosus do not exhibit genotoxic activity, and the species is not known to be a producer of mycotoxins. However, some secondary metabolites of the fungus have been found to have anti-inflammatory activity similar to the drug dexamethasone .
