= Carl Wehmer =

German botanist and chemist (1858–1935)

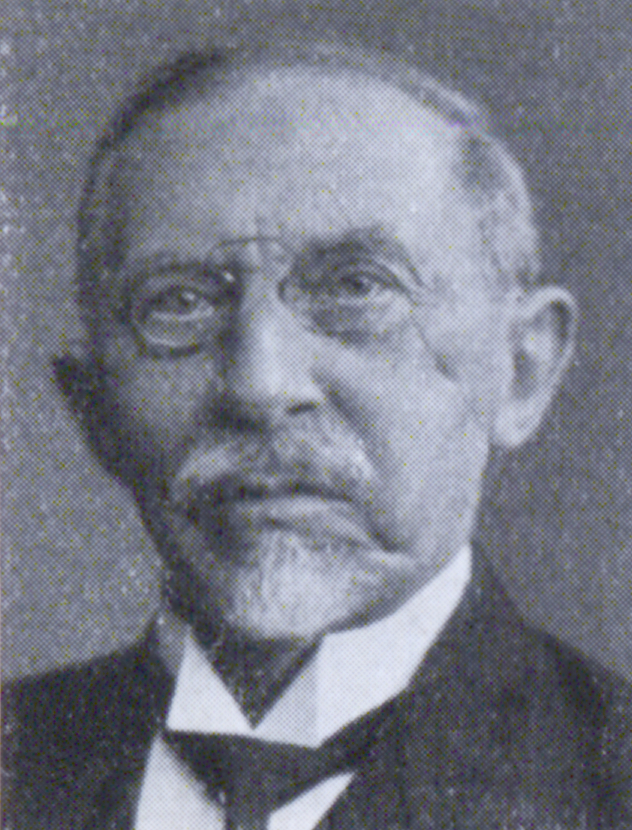
Carl Wehmer

Carl Friedrich Wilhelm Wehmer (20 September 1858 Freiburg, Kingdom of Hanover - 11 January 1935 Hannover, Germany), was a German chemist and mycologist. He worked on the production of citric acid by fermentation.
