= Benjaminiella =

Scientific classification
- Kingdom: Fungi
- Division: Mucoromycota
- Class: Mucoromycetes
- Order: Mucorales
- Family: Mycotyphaceae
- Genus: Benjaminiella; Arx, 1981

Genus of fungi

Benjaminiella is a genus of fungi belonging to the family Mucoraceae.

The genus name of Benjaminiella is in honour of Richard Keith Benjamin (1922 - 2002), an American botanist from Rancho Santa Ana Botanic Garden.

Species:

- Benjaminiella multispora Benny, Samson & M.C.Sriniv.
- Benjaminiella poitrasii (R.K.Benj.) Arx
- Benjaminiella youngii P.M.Kirk
