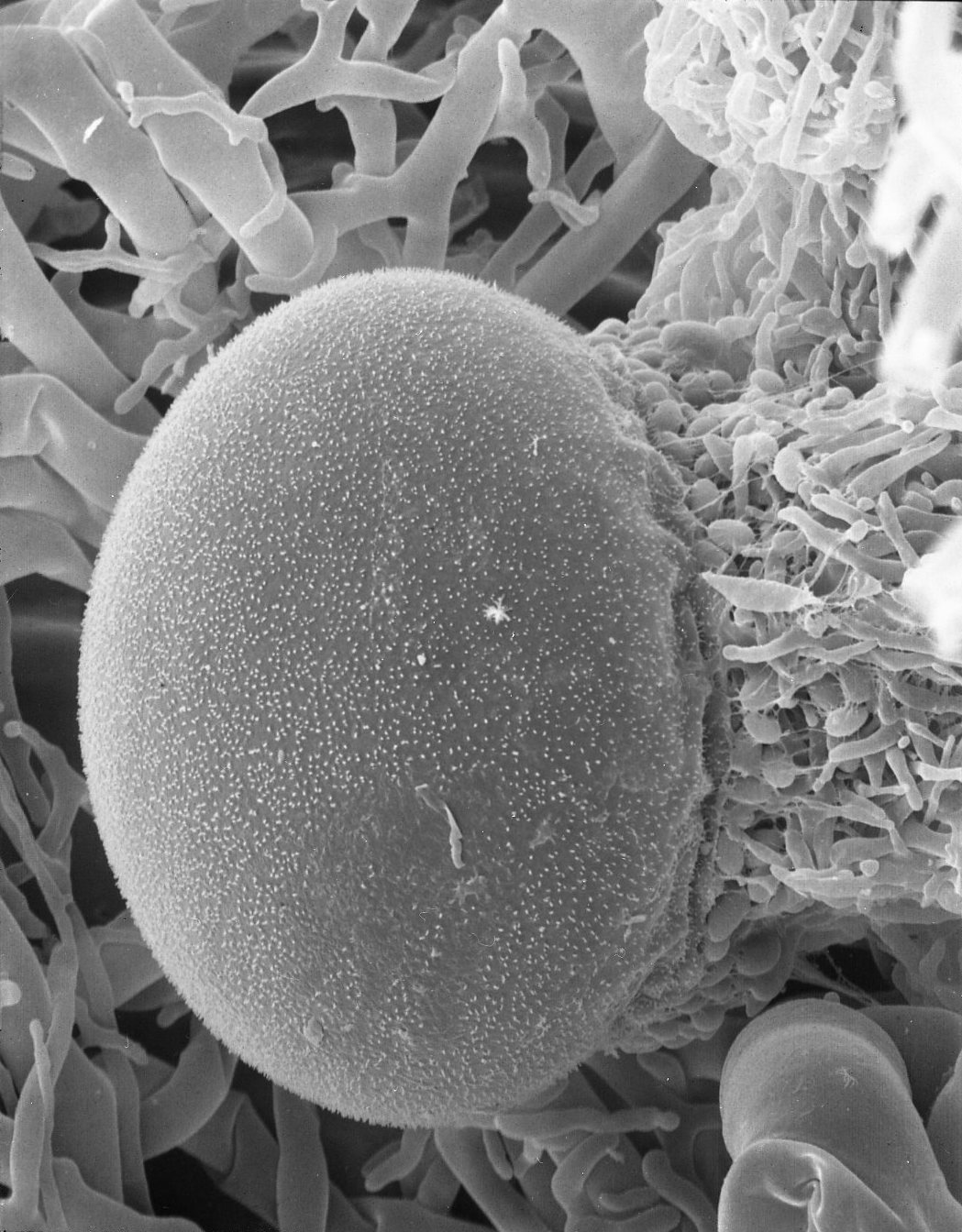
- Pilaira anomala

Scientific classification
- Domain: Eukaryota
- Kingdom: Fungi
- Division: Mucoromycota
- Class: Mucoromycetes
- Order: Mucorales
- Family: Pilobolaceae
- Genus: Pilaira; Teigh.

Species
- See text

= Pilaira =

Genus of fungi

Pilaira is a genus of zygote fungi described in 1875.

== Species ==
The genus consists of the following species:

- Pilaira anomala (Ces.) J. Schröt.
- Pilaira australis Urquhart, Coulon & Idnurm
- Pilaira caucasica Milko
- Pilaira dimidiata Grove
- Pilaira fimetaria
- Pilaira moreaui Y. Ling
- Pilaira nigrescens
- Pilaira praeampla R.Y. Zheng & X.Y. Liu
- Pilaira subangularis R.Y. Zheng & X.Y. Liu
