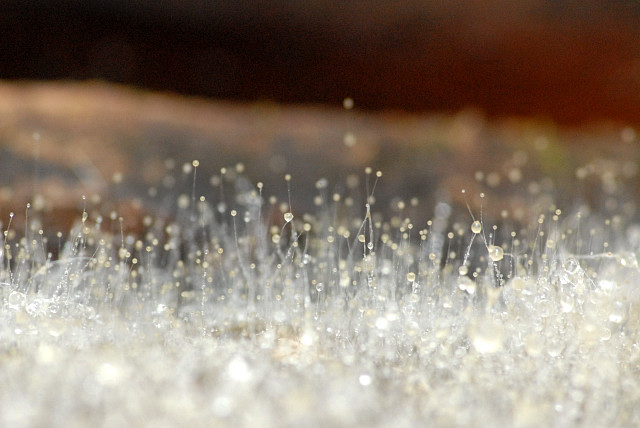
- Mucor mucedo

Scientific classification
- Kingdom: Fungi
- Division: Mucoromycota
- Class: Mucoromycetes
- Order: Mucorales
- Family: Mucoraceae
- Genus: Mucor; Fresen.

Species
- See text

= Mucor =

Genus of fungi

Mucor is a microbial genus of approximately 40 species of molds and dimorphic fungi in the family Mucoraceae. The genus includes both pathogenic and avirulent species, and some members of it can be utilized in biotechnical applications. These fungi are commonly found in soil, digestive systems, plant surfaces, some cheeses like Tomme de Savoie, rotten vegetable matter, and iron oxide residue in the biosorption process.

== Description ==
Colonies of this fungal genus are typically yellow, beige or grey. They are characterized by rapid growth and sporulation in high a_{w} environments, and they reproduce both sexually and asexually.

Mucor spores or sporangiospores can be simple or branched and form apical, globular sporangia that are supported and elevated by a column-shaped columella. Mucor species can be differentiated from molds of the genera Absidia, Rhizomucor, and Rhizopus by the shape and insertion of the columella, and the lack of stolons and rhizoids. Some Mucor species produce chlamydospores. They form mold with irregular non-septate hyphae branching at wide angles (>90°).

== Reproduction ==
Mucor mucedo (type species) use asexual reproduction. When erect hyphal sporangiophores are formed, the tip of the sporangiophore swells to form a globose sporangium that contains uninucleate, haploid sporangiospores. An extension of the sporangiophore called the columella protrudes into the sporangium. The sporangium walls are easily ruptured to release the spores, which germinate readily to form a new mycelium on appropriate substrates.

During sexual reproduction, compatible strains form short, specialized hyphae called gametangia. At the point where two complementary gametangia fuse, a thick-walled, spherical zygosporangium develops. The zygosporangium typically contains a single zygospore. Nuclear karyogamy and meiosis (sexual recombination) occur within it.

== Clinical significance ==
Most species of Mucor are unable to cause disease in humans and endothermic animals due to their inability to grow at temperatures around 37 °C. But some thermotolerant species such as Mucor circinelloides, M. irregularis and M. hiemalis can cause mucormycosis, an acute and invasive fungal infection affecting primarily immunocompromised hosts. Many Mucor species fungi are intrinsically resistant to most available antifungals, which causes issues in treatment of this disease. The available treatment options all target the ergosterol biosynthesis pathway of these fungi, and mutations in genes transcribing enzymes for it have been linked to resistance development towards the primary treatment option for the disease.

== Selected species ==
- M. amphibiorum
- M. bainieri
- M. circinelloides
- M. ellipsoideus
- M. fragilis
- M. hiemalis
- M. indicus
- M. irregularis
- M. mucedo
- M. paronychius
- M. piriformis
- M. plumbeus
- M. pseudolusitanicus
- M. racemosus
- M. ramosissimus
- M. silvaticus
- M. variicolumellatus
- M. velutinosus
