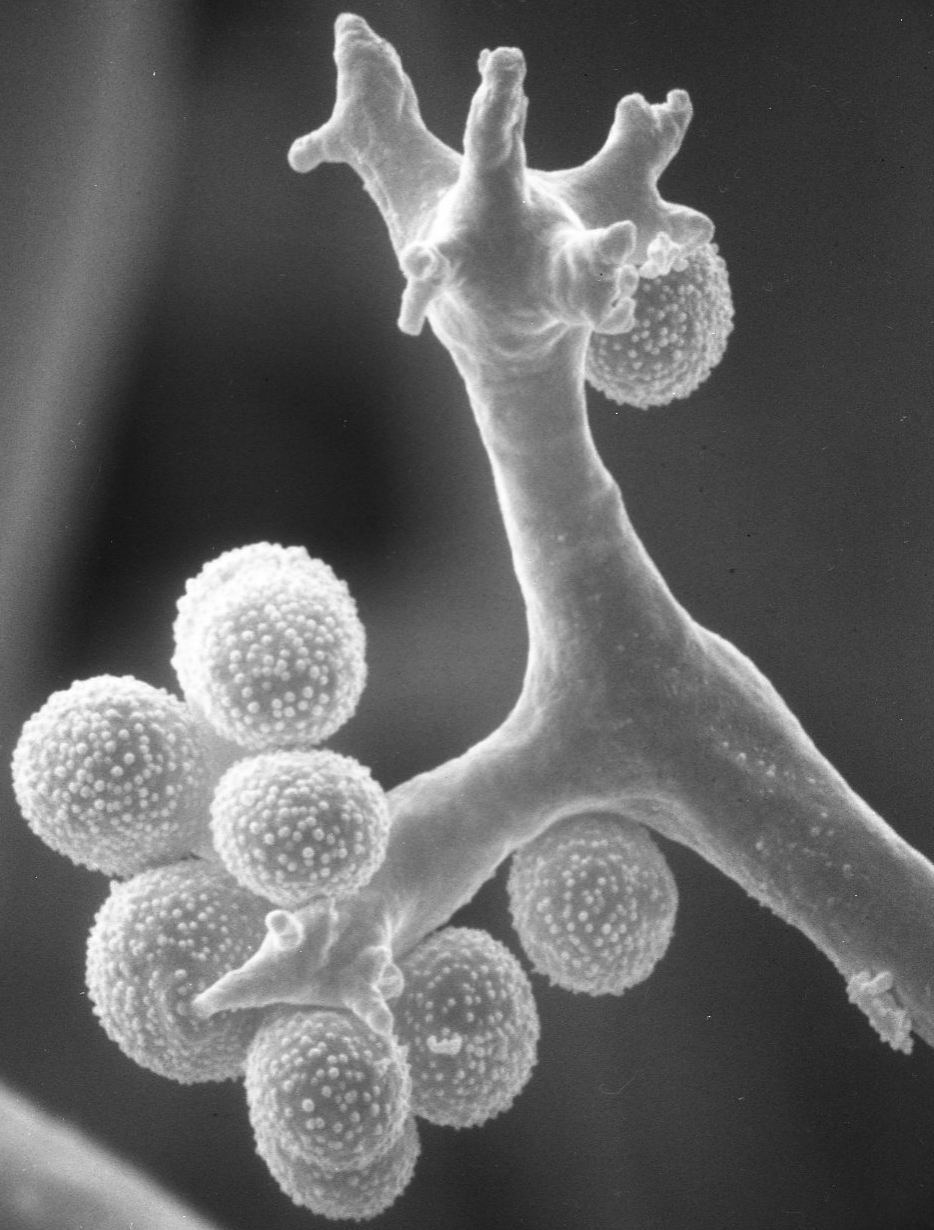
- Chaetocladium brefeldii

Scientific classification
- Kingdom: Fungi
- Division: Mucoromycota
- Class: Mucoromycetes
- Order: Mucorales
- Family: Mucoraceae; Dumort. (1822)

Type genus
- Mucor Fresen. (1850)

Genera
- See text

Synonyms
- Chaetocladiaceae A. Fisch., 1892; Dicranophoraceae J.H. Mirza, 1979; Thamnidiaceae Fitzp., 1930

= Mucoraceae =

Family of fungi

The Mucoraceae are a family of fungi of the order Mucorales, characterized by having the thallus not segmented or ramified. Pathogenic genera include Absidia, Apophysomyces, Mucor, Rhizomucor, and Rhizopus. According to a 2008 estimate, the family contains 25 genera and 129 species.

== Genera ==
The family consists of the following genera:

- Actinomucor
- Apophysomyces
- Benjaminiella
- Chaetocladium
- Circinella
- Cokeromyces
- Dicranophora
- Ellisomyces
- Helicostylum
- Hyphomucor
- Kirkomyces
- Mucor
- Parasitella
- Pilaira
- Pilophora
- Pirella
- Rhizomucor
- Rhizopodopsis
- Rhizopus
- Sporodiniella
- Syzygites
- Thamnidium
- Thermomucor
- Zygorhynchus
