= List of citrus diseases =

The following is a list of diseases in citrus plants.

== Bacterial diseases ==
Bacterial diseases
Bacterial spot	Xanthomonas euvesicatoria pv. citrumelo
Black pit (fruit)	Pseudomonas syringae
Blast	Pseudomonas syringae
Citrus canker	Xanthomonas citri pv. citri
Citrus variegated chlorosis	Xylella fastidiosa
Huanglongbing = citrus greening	Candidatus Liberibacter asiaticus Candidatus L. africanus

== Fungal diseases ==
Fungal diseases
Albinism	Alternaria alternata = Alternaria tenuis Aspergillus flavus
Alternaria brown spot	Alternaria alternata
Alternaria leaf spot of rough lemon	Alternaria citri
Alternaria stem-end rot	Alternaria citri
Anthracnose = wither-tip	Glomerella cingulata Colletotrichum gloeosporioides [anamorph]
Areolate leaf spot	Thanatephorus cucumeris = Pellicularia filamentosa Rhizoctonia solani [anamorph]
Black mold rot	Aspergillus niger
Black root rot	Thielaviopsis basicola Chalara elegans [synanamorph]
Black rot	Alternaria citri
Black spot	Guignardia citricarpa Phyllosticta citricarpa [synanamorph]
Blue mold	Penicillium italicum
Botrytis blossom and twig blight, gummosis	Botrytis cinerea Botryotinia fuckeliana [teleomorph]
Branch knot	Sphaeropsis tumefaciens
Brown rot (fruit)	Phytophthora citricola Phytophthora citrophthora Phytophthora hibernalis Phytophthora nicotianae var. parasitica = Phytophthora parasitica Phytophthora palmivora Phytophthora syringae
Charcoal root rot	Macrophomina phaseolina
Citrus black spot	Guignardia citricarpa
Damping-off	Pythium sp. Pythium aphanidermatum Pythium debaryanum Pythium rostratum Pythium ultimum Pythium vexans Rhizoctonia solani
Diplodia gummosis and stem-end rot	Lasiodiplodia theobromae = Botryodiplodia theobromae = Diplodia natalensis Botryosphaeria rhodina [teleomorph]
Dothiorella gummosis and rot	Botryosphaeria ribis Dothiorella gregaria [anamorph]
Dry root rot complex	Nectria haematococca Fusarium solani [anamorph] together with other wound-invading agents
Dry rot (fruit)	Ashbya gossypii Nematospora coryli
Fly speck	Schizothyrium pomi Zygophiala jamaicensis [anamorph]
Fusarium rot (fruit)	Fusarium spp.
Fusarium wilt	Fusarium oxysporum f.sp. citri
Gray mold (fruit)	Botrytis cinerea
Greasy spot and greasy spot rind blotch	Mycosphaerella citri Stenella citri-grisea [anamorph]
Green mold	Penicillium digitatum
Heart rot	Ganoderma applanatum Ganoderma brownii Ganoderma lucidum and other basidiomycetes
Hendersonula branch wilt	Hendersonula toruloidea
Leaf spot	Mycosphaerella horii Mycosphaerella lageniformis
Mal secco	Phoma tracheiphila = Deuterophoma tracheiphila
Mancha foliar de los citricos	Alternaria limicola
Melanose	Diaporthe citri Phomopsis citri [anamorph]
Mucor fruit rot	Mucor paronychia Mucor racemosus
Mushroom root rot = shoestring root rot or oak root fungus	Armillaria mellea = Clitocybe tabescens Rhizomorpha subcorticalis [anamorph]
Phaeoramularia leaf and fruit spot	Phaeoramularia angolensis
Phymatotrichum root rot	Phymatotrichopsis omnivora
Phomopsis stem-end rot	Phomopsis citri Diaporthe citri [teleomorph]
Phytophthora foot rot, gummosis and root rot	Phytophthora citrophthora Phytophthora hibernalis Phytophthora nicotianae var. parasitica = Phytophthora parasitica Phytophthora palmivora Phytophthora syringae
Pink disease	Erythricium salmonicolor = Corticium salmonicolor Necator decretus [anamorph]
Pink mold	Gliocladium roseum
Pleospora rot	Pleospora herbarum Stemphylium herbarum [anamorph]
Poria root rot	Oxyporus latemarginatus = Poria latemarginata
Post bloom fruit drop	Colletotrichum acutatum
Powdery mildew	Oidium tingitaninum = Acrosporium tingitaninum
Rhizopus rot	Rhizopus stolonifer
Rio Grande gummosis	Possibly Lasiodiplodia theobromae Hendersonula toruloidea and other unknown agents
Rootlet rot	Pythium rostratum Pythium ultimum
Rosellinia root rot	Rosellinia sp.
Scab	Elsinoë fawcettii Sphaceloma fawcettii [anamorph]
Sclerotinia twig blight, fruit rot and root rot	Sclerotinia sclerotiorum
Septoria spot	Septoria citri
Sooty blotch	Gloeodes pomigena
Sour rot	Geotrichum citri-aurantii Galactomyces citri-aurantii [teleomorph] Galactomyces candidum Galactomyces geotrichum [teleomorph]
Sweet orange scab	Elsinoë australis
Thread blight	Corticium stevensii Pellicularia koleroga
Trichoderma rot	Trichoderma viride Hypocrea sp. [teleomorph]
Twig blight	Rhytidhysteron rufulum
Ustulina root rot	Ustulina deusta Nodulisporium sp. [anamorph]
Whisker mold	Penicillium ulaiense
White root rot	Rosellinia sp. Rosellinia necatrix Dematophora necatrix [anamorph] Rosellinia subiculata

== Nematodes, parasitic ==
Nematodes, parasitic
Citrus slump nematode	Pratylenchus coffeae
Dagger nematode	Xiphinema spp.
Lesion nematode	Pratylenchus spp. Pratylenchus brachyurus Pratylenchus coffeae Pratylenchus vulnus
Needle nematode	Longidorus spp.
Root-knot nematode	Meloidogyne spp.
Sheath nematode	Hemicycliophora spp. Hemicycliophora arenaria
Slow decline (citrus nematode)	Tylenchulus semipenetrans
Spreading decline (burrowing nematode)	Radopholus similis
Sting nematode	Belonolaimus longicaudatus
Stubby-root nematode	Paratrichodorus spp.
Stunt nematode	Tylenchorhynchus spp.

== Viral diseases ==
Viral diseases
Citrus mosaic	Satsuma dwarf-related virus
Bud union crease	Virus for some combinations, otherwise genetic or unknown
Citrus leaf rugose	genus Ilarvirus, Citrus leaf rugose virus (CLRV)
Citrus yellow mosaic	genus Badnavirus
Crinkly leaf	Crinkly leaf virus (strain of Citrus variegation virus)
Infectious variegation	genus Ilarvirus, Citrus variegation virus (CVV)
Navel infectious mottling	Satsuma dwarf-related virus
Psorosis	Citrus psorosis virus (CPsV)
Satsuma dwarf	Satsuma dwarf virus (SDV)
Tatter leaf = citrange stunt	genus Capillovirus, Citrus tatter leaf virus (probably a closely related strain of Apple stem grooving virus rather than a distinct virus )
Tristeza = decline and stem pitting, seedling yellows	genus Closterovirus, Citrus tristeza virus (CTV)
Citrus Leprosis Virus type I & II

== Viroids and graft-transmissible pathogens [GTP] ==
Viroids and graft-transmissible pathogens [GTP]
Algerian navel orange virus	GTP
Blight = young tree decline, rough lemon decline	GTP
Blind pocket	GTP
Cachexia	Citrus cachexia viroid (Hostuviroid)
Chlorotic dwarf	White-fly transmitted GTP
Citrus dwarfing	Various viroids
Citrus vein enation (CVEV) = woody gall	GTP (possible luteovirus)
Citrus yellow mottle	GTP
Citrus yellow ringspot	GTP
Concave gum	GTP
Cristacortis	GTP
Exocortis	Citrus exocortis viroid (CEVd) Pospiviroidae
Fatal yellows	GTP
Gummy bark	GTP, possible viroid
Gum pocket and gummy pittings	GTP, possible viroid
Impietratura	GTP
Indian citrus ringspot	GTP
Leaf curl	GTP
Leathery leaf	GTP
Leprosis	GTP associated with Brevipalpus spp. mites
Measles	GTP
Milam stem-pitting	GTP
Multiple sprouting disease	GTP
Nagami kumquat disease	GTP
Ringspot diseases	Various GTPs
Xyloporosis = cachexia	Citrus cachexia viroid (Hostuviroid)
Yellow vein	GTP
Yellow vein clearing of lemon	GTP

== Phytoplasmal and spiroplasmal diseases ==
Phytoplasmal and spiroplasmal diseases
Australian citrus dieback	Unknown procaryote?
Stubborn	Spiroplasma citri (spread by leafhoppers)
Witches’ broom of lime	Phytoplasma

== Miscellaneous diseases and disorders ==
Miscellaneous diseases and disorders
Algal disease (algal spot)	Cephaleuros virescens
Amachamiento	Unknown
Blossom-end clearing	Physiological
Chilling injury	Cold temperatures
Citrus blight	Unknown — pathogen suspected
Creasing	Nutritional (?)
Crinkle scurf	Genetic
Granulation	Physiological
Lemon sieve-tube necrosis	Unknown, but hereditary
Lime blotch = wood pocket	Inherited chimeral agent
Membranous stain	Cold temperatures
Mesophyll collapse	Unknown
Oleocellosis	Physiological
Postharvest pitting	Physiological
Puffing	Physiological
Rind breakdown	Physiological
Rind staining	Physiological
Rind stipple of grapefruit	Environmental
Rumple of lemon fruit	Unknown
Shell bark complex	Unknown — (viroid?)
Sooty mold (superficial, not pathogenic)	Capnodium C. citricola Capnodium sp.
Stem-end rind breakdown	Physiological
Stylar-end breakdown of Tahiti lime	Physiological
Stylar-end rind breakdown	Physiological
Stylar-end rot	Physiological
Sunburn	Excessive heat and light
Tangerine dieback	Unknown
Water spot	Physiological
Woody galls on stems	Bruchophagus fellis (Citrus Gall Wasp)
Zebra skin	Physiological
