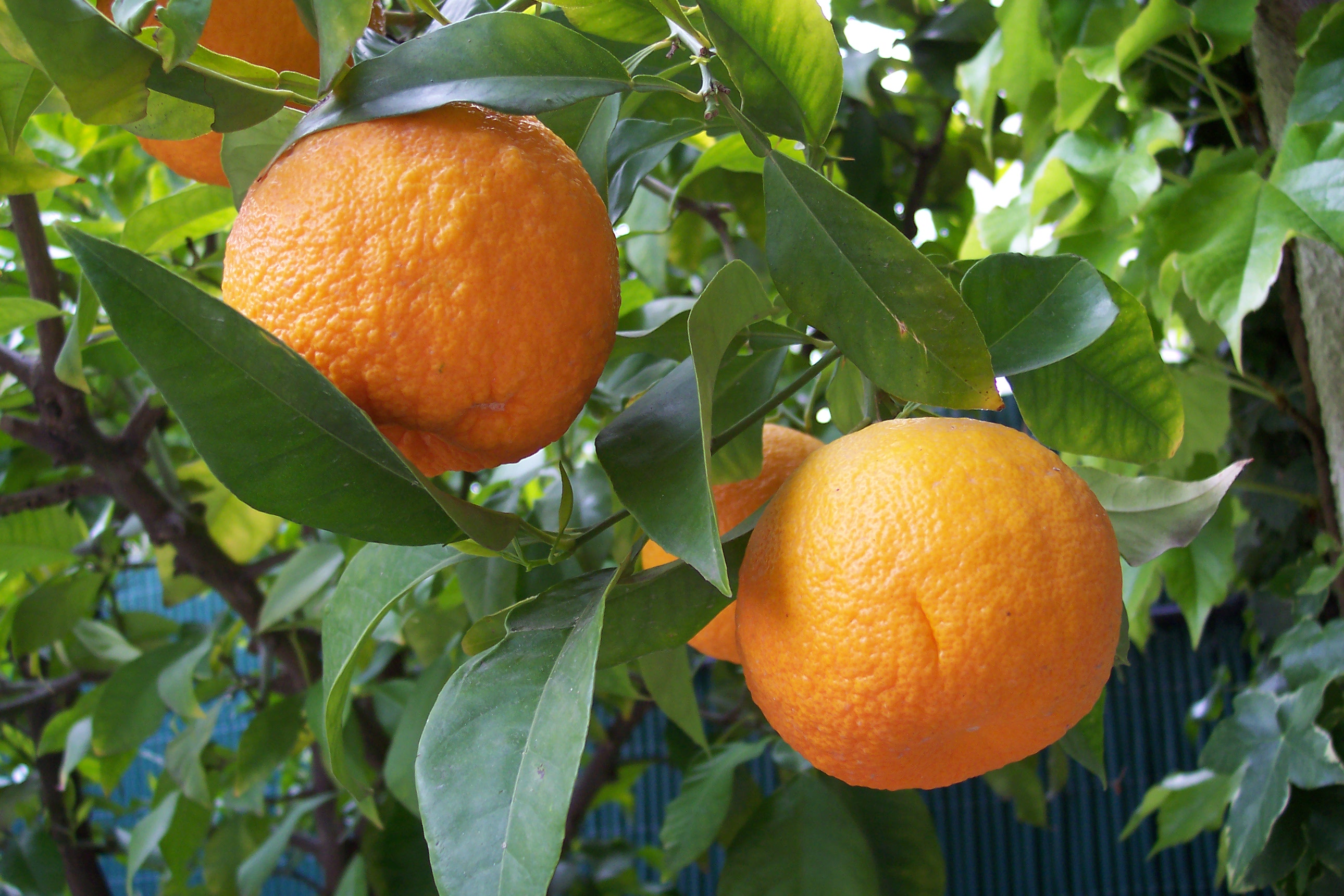

Scientific classification
- Kingdom: Plantae
- Clade: Tracheophytes
- Clade: Angiosperms
- Clade: Eudicots
- Clade: Rosids
- Order: Sapindales
- Family: Rutaceae
- Genus: Citrus
- Species: C. × aurantium

Binomial name
- Citrus × aurantium L., 1753

Synonyms
- List: Aurantium × acre Mill.; Aurantium × bigarella Poit. & Turpin; Aurantium × corniculatum Mill.; Aurantium × corniculatum Poit. & Turpin; Aurantium × coronatum Poit. & Turpin; Aurantium × distortum Mill.; Aurantium × humile Mill.; Aurantium × myrtifolium Descourt.; Aurantium × orientale Mill.; Aurantium × silvestre Pritz.; Aurantium × sinense (L.) Mill.; Aurantium × variegatum Barb.Rodr.; Aurantium × vulgare (Risso) M. Gómez; Citrus bigaradia Risso & Poit.; Citrus humilis (Mill.) Poir.; Citrus × amara Link; Citrus × benikoji Yu.Tanaka; Citrus × bigaradia Loisel.; Citrus × calot Lag.; Citrus × canaliculata Yu.Tanaka; Citrus × changshan-huyou Y.B.Chang; Citrus × communis Poit. & Turpin; Citrus × dulcimedulla Pritz.; Citrus × dulcis Pers.; Citrus × florida Salisb.; Citrus × funadoko Yu.Tanaka; Citrus × fusca Lour.; Citrus × glaberrima Yu.Tanaka; Citrus × humilis (Mill.) Poir.; Citrus × intermedia Yu.Tanaka; Citrus × iwaikan Yu.Tanaka; Citrus × iyo Yu.Tanaka nom. inval.; Citrus × kotokan Hayata; Citrus × medioglobosa Yu.Tanaka; Citrus × mitsuharu Yu.Tanaka; Citrus × myrtifolia (Ker Gawl.) Raf.; Citrus × natsudaidai (Yu.Tanaka) Hayata; Citrus × omikanto Yu.Tanaka; Citrus × pseudogulgul Shirai; Citrus × rumphii Risso; Citrus × sinograndis Yu.Tanaka nom. inval.; Citrus × subcompressa (Tanaka) Yu.Tanaka; Citrus × sulcata Yu.Tanaka nom. inval.; Citrus × taiwanica Yu.Tanaka & Shimada; Citrus × tengu Yu.Tanaka nom. inval.; Citrus × tosa-asahi Yu.Tanaka; Citrus × vulgaris Risso; Citrus × yatsushiro Yu.Tanaka; Citrus × yuge-hyokan Yu.Tanaka

= Bitter orange =

Citrus × aurantium

Hybrid citrus plant

The bitter orange, sour orange, Seville orange, bigarade orange, or marmalade orange is the hybrid citrus tree species Citrus × aurantium, and its fruit. It is native to Southeast Asia and has been spread by humans to many parts of the world. It is a cross between the pomelo, Citrus maxima, and the wild type mandarin orange, Citrus reticulata. The bitter orange is used to make essential oil, used in foods, drinks, and pharmaceuticals. The Seville orange is prized for making British orange marmalade.

== Definition ==
In some proposed systems, the species Citrus × aurantium includes not only the bitter orange proper, but all other hybrids between the pomelo and the wild type mandarin, namely the sweet orange, the grapefruit, and all cultivated mandarins. This article only deals with the bitter orange proper.

== History ==
The bitter orange, like many cultivated Citrus species, is a hybrid, in its case of the wild mandarin and pomelo.

The bitter orange, like many cultivated Citrus species, is a hybrid, in its case of the wild mandarin and pomelo.

The bitter orange spread from its native ranges of South China and Southeast Asia via India and Iran to the Islamic world as early as 700 AD in the Arab Agricultural Revolution. After the Columbian exchange, the pomelo was introduced to the New World, starting in Mexico by 1568.

== Botany ==
=== Description ===
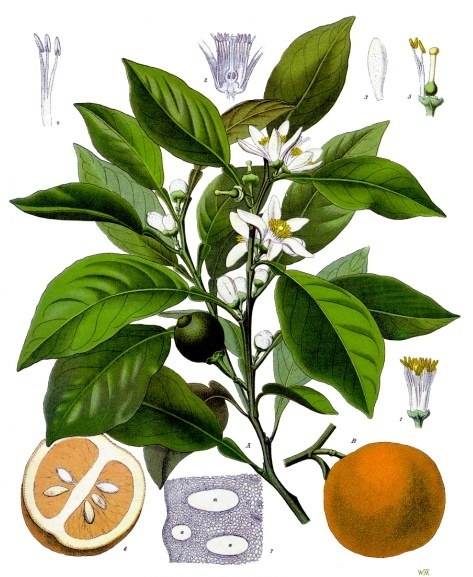
Foliage, blossoms and fruit. Köhler's Medizinal-Pflanzen, 1897

The bitter orange has orange fruit with a distinctly bitter or sour taste. The tree has alternate simple leaves on long petioles; there are long thorns on the petiole. The trees require little care and may live for as long as 600 years. It grows in subtropical regions but can tolerate a brief frost.

=== Pests and diseases ===
The bitter orange has many of the same pests and diseases as other citrus fruits. Viral diseases include citrus tristeza virus, crinkly leaf virus, and xyloporosis. Among the many fungal diseases are anthracnose, dieback, and heart rot.

=== Varieties ===
- C. × aurantium var. myrtifolia is possibly a distinct species, Citrus myrtifolia. The 'Chinotto' cultivar is used to make the drink of the same name.
- C. × aurantium var. daidai, the daidai, is used in Chinese medicine and in tea.
- C. × aurantium subsp. currassuviencis, the laraha, grows on the Caribbean island of Curaçao. The dried peel is used in Curaçao liqueur.

Among the many related species is Citrus bergamia, the bergamot orange. This is probably a bitter orange and limetta hybrid; it is cultivated in Italy for the production of bergamot oil, a component of many brands of perfume and tea, especially Earl Grey tea. It is a less hardy plant than other bitter orange varieties.

== Uses ==
=== Culinary ===
While the raw pulp is not usually eaten, bitter orange is widely used in cooking. The Seville orange (the usual name in this context) is prized for making British orange marmalade, being higher in pectin than the sweet orange, and therefore giving a better set and a higher yield. Once a year, oranges of this variety are collected from trees in Seville and shipped to Britain to be used in marmalade. However, the fruit is rarely consumed locally in Andalusia. This reflects Britain, Portugal and Spain's historic Atlantic trading relationship; an early recipe for 'marmelet of oranges' was recorded by Eliza Cholmondeley in 1677. Bitter orange—bigarade—was used in all early recipes for duck à l'orange, originally called canard à la bigarade. Malta too has a tradition of making bitter oranges into marmalade.

In Finland, mämmi is a fermented malted rye dough flavoured with ground Seville orange zest. Across Scandinavia, bitter orange peel is used in dried, ground form in baked goods such as Christmas bread and gingerbread. In Greece, the nerántzi is one of the most prized fruits used for spoon sweets. In Adana province, Turkey, bitter orange jam is a principal dessert. Bitter oranges are made into chutneys in India, either in the style of a raita with curds, or roasted, spiced, and sweetened to form a condiment that can be preserved in jars. In Yucatán (Mexico), it is a main ingredient of the cochinita pibil. In Suriname, its juice is used in the well-known dish pom.

An essential oil is extracted from the peel of dried, unripe bitter oranges; C. aurantium var. curassaviensis in particular is used in Curaçao liqueur. An oil is pressed from the fresh peel of ripe fruit in many countries and used in ice creams, puddings, sweets, soft and alcoholic drinks, and pharmaceuticals. The flowers are distilled to yield Neroli oil and orange flower water, with similar uses. Neroli oil is also employed in perfumes. The peel of bitter oranges is used as a spice in Belgian Witbier (white beer), for orange-flavored liqueurs such as Cointreau, and to produce bitters such as Oranjebitter. It is a component of Nordic hot spiced wine, glögg.

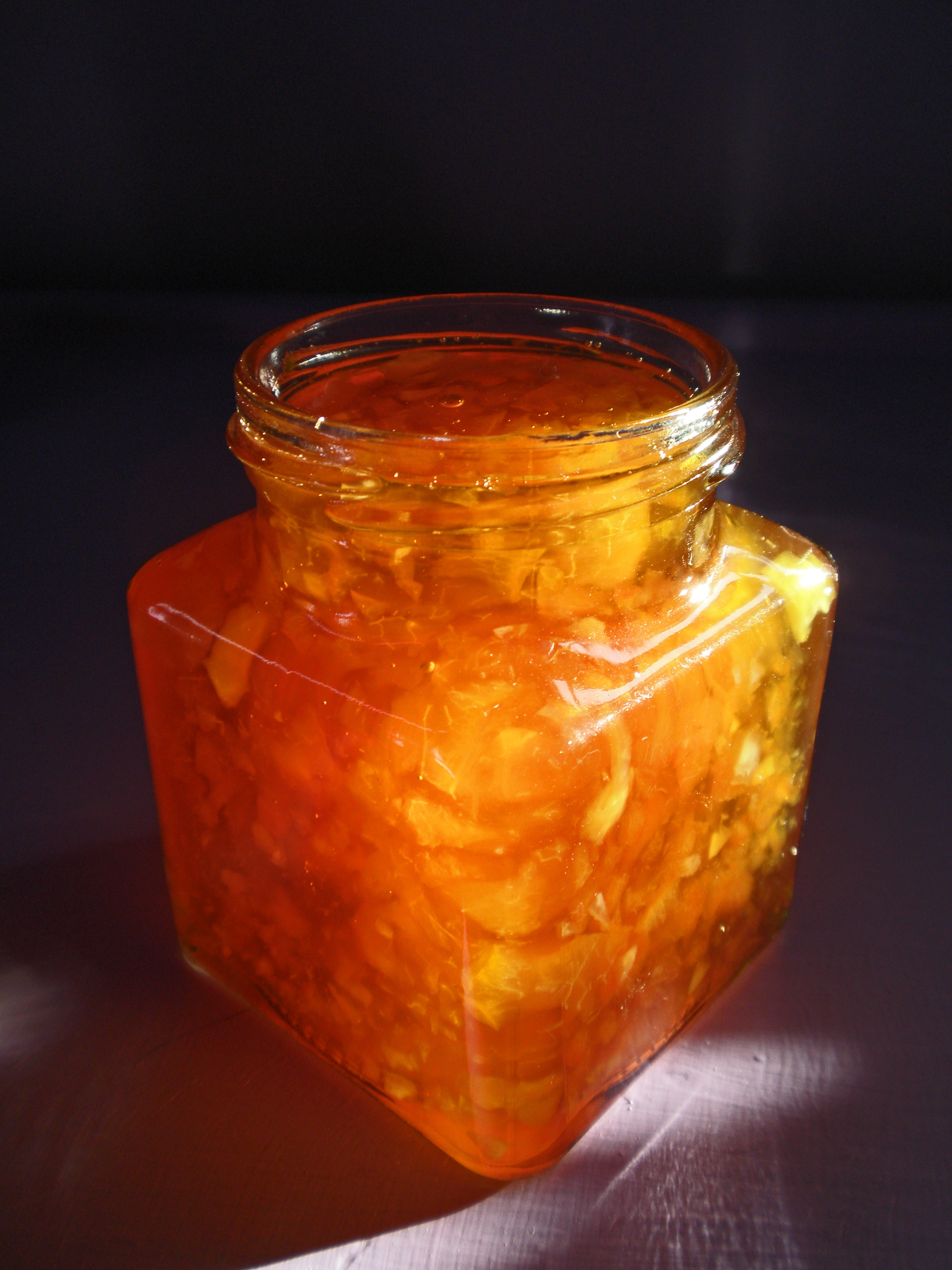
English marmalade is traditionally homemade in the winter

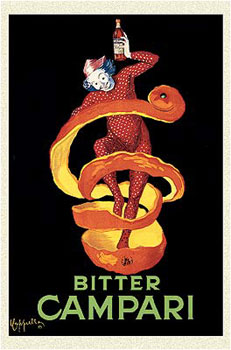
"Bitter Campari" poster, Leonetto Cappiello, c. 1921

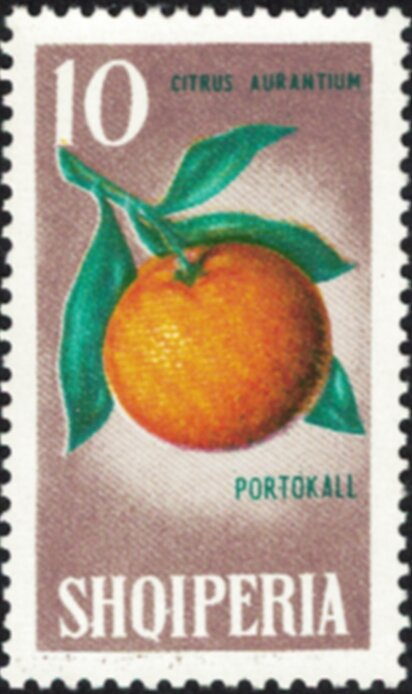
1965 Albanian postage stamp

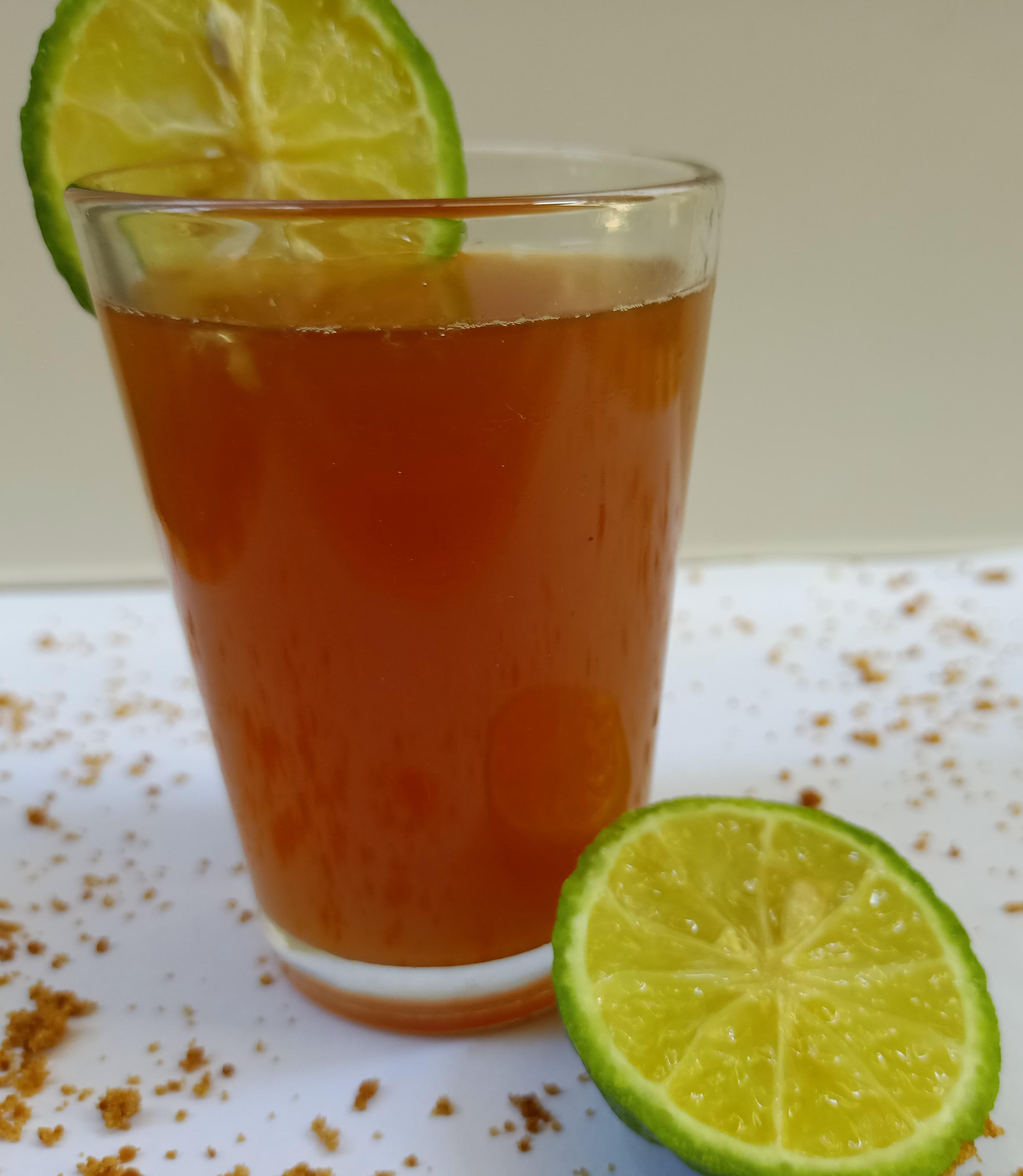
Narthangai juice, India

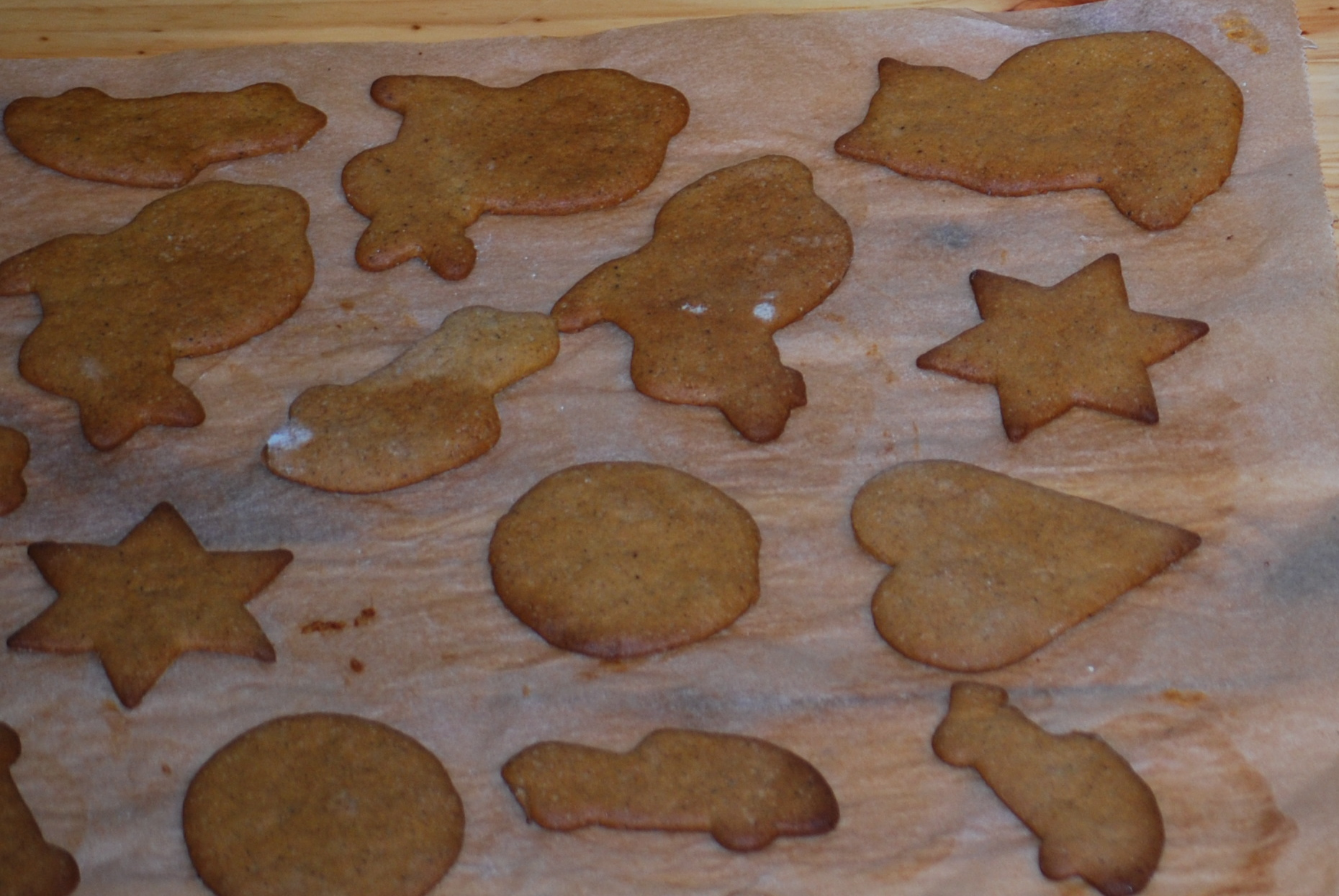
Homemade pepparkakor gingerbread, Sweden

=== Rootstock, wood, and soap ===
The bitter orange is used as a rootstock in groves of sweet orange. The fruit and leaves make lather and can be used as soap. The hard, white or light-yellow wood is used in woodworking and made into baseball bats in Cuba.

=== Herbal stimulant ===
Extracts of bitter orange and its peel have been marketed as dietary supplements purported to act as a weight-loss aid and appetite suppressant. Bitter orange contains the tyramine metabolites N-methyltyramine, octopamine, and synephrine, substances similar to epinephrine, which act on the α_{1} adrenergic receptor to constrict blood vessels and increase blood pressure and heart rate.

Following bans on the herbal stimulant ephedra in the U.S., Canada, and elsewhere, bitter orange has been substituted into "ephedra-free" herbal weight-loss products by dietary supplement manufacturers. Bitter orange is believed to cause the same spectrum of adverse events as ephedra. Case reports have linked bitter orange supplements to strokes, angina, ischemic colitis, and myocardial infarction. The U.S. National Center for Complementary and Integrative Health found "little evidence that bitter orange is safer to use than ephedra."

== Drug interactions ==
Bitter orange may have serious grapefruit-like drug interactions with medicines such as statins (to lower cholesterol), nifedipines (to lower blood pressure), some anti-anxiety drugs, and some antihistamines.
