= Hemicycliophora arenaria =

Scientific classification
- Kingdom: Animalia
- Phylum: Nematoda
- Class: Chromadorea
- Order: Rhabditida
- Family: Hemicycliophoridae
- Genus: Hemicycliophora
- Species: H. arenaria

Binomial name
- Hemicycliophora arenaria Raski

Species of roundworm

Hemicycliophora arenaria is a plant pathogenic nematode.

== See also ==
- List of Capsicum diseases
- List of citrus diseases
