= D. citri =

D. citri may refer to:

- Diaporthe citri, a plant pathogen
- Diaphorina citri, the Asian citrus psyllid, a sap-sucking hemipteran bug species
