= Brio (soft drink) =

Canadian soft drink and chinotto variant

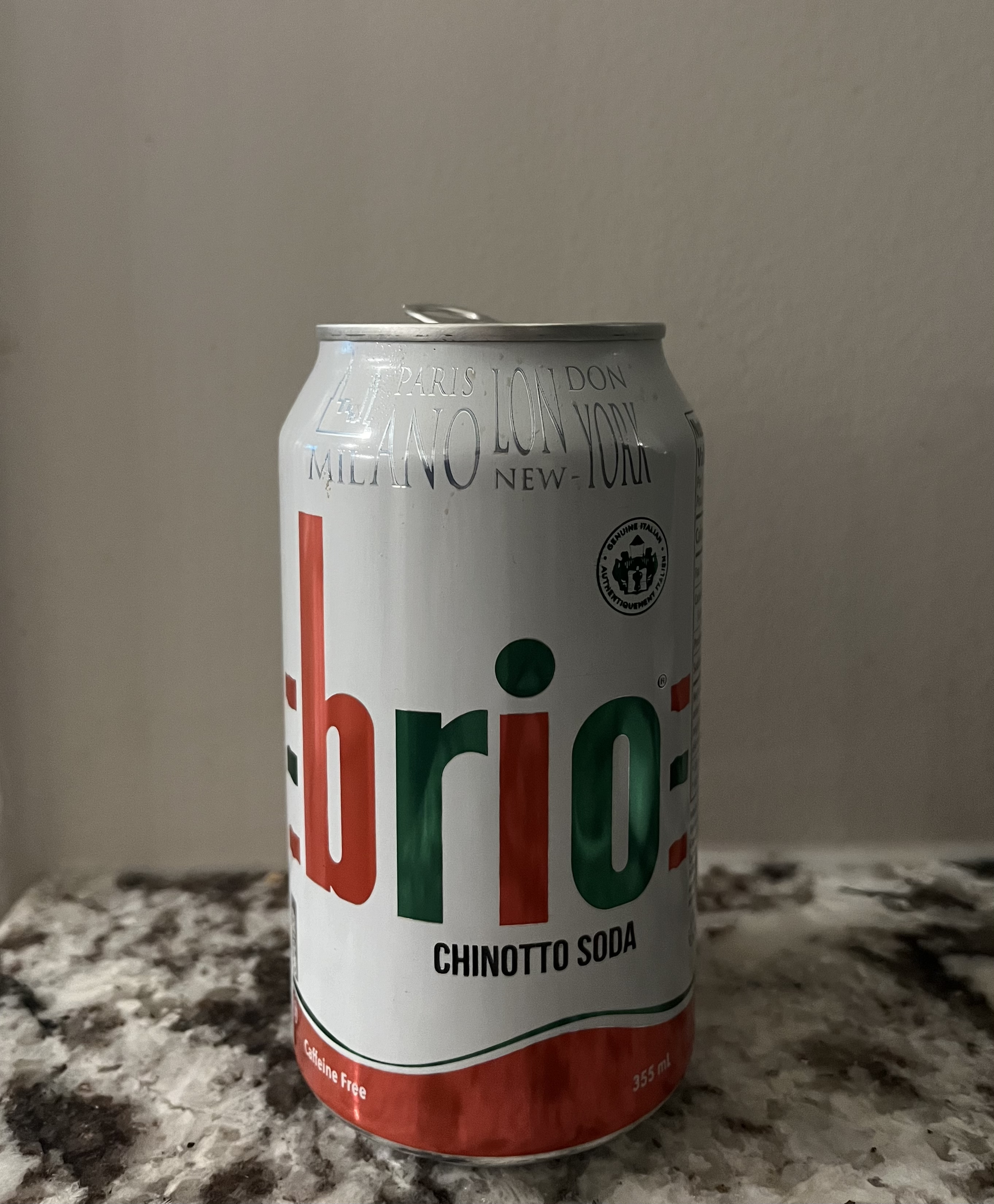
- A can of Brio's chinotto soda
- Type: Chinotto
- Manufacturer: National Dry Beverages
- Origin: Toronto, Ontario, Canada
- Introduced: 1959
- Colour: Caramel colour
- Flavour: Chinotto
- Ingredients: Carbonated water, glucose-fructose, caramel colour, natural flavour, phosphoric acid, sodium benzoate
- Website: drinkbriosoda.ca

Brio or Brio chinotto soda is a Canadian version of chinotto, a bittersweet carbonated soft drink made with the fruit of the same name. The drink originates in Italy in the 1930s. Brio is manufactured by National Dry Beverages, previously known as Mio Manufacturing. Brio is a sweeter version of the traditional Italian drink.

== History ==
Brio was created by three Italian immigrants in Toronto, Ontario, Canada, in 1959—Elio Madonia, who immigrated to Canada in 1950 from Corleone, Sicily, and his partners Giuseppe Panacci and Angelo Pirrello that he had met during his time as an insurance salesman. Panacci and Pirrello had met as competing door-to-door salesmen for Punch Dry and New Jersey brand colas. The three partners created a number of beverages, including Mio, a lemon-lime gazzosa, and Brio, and purchased a used bottling line in downtown Toronto for $4,500 in 1959. The company moved to North York in the mid 1960s.

In April 2018, the Liquor Control Board of Ontario launched an alcoholic version of Brio mixed with vodka.

== Ingredients ==
Brio is made of Carbonated water, sugar, caramel colour, imported chinotto extract from Italy, phosphoric acid and, sodium benzoate. It is bottled in Canada by National Dry Beverages, previously known as Mio Manufacturing, established by the three partners.

== Impact ==
Brio has become a popular beverage in Ontario, particularly among Italian immigrants, serving as a marker of identity for the Italian emigrant population in Canada.

== Design ==
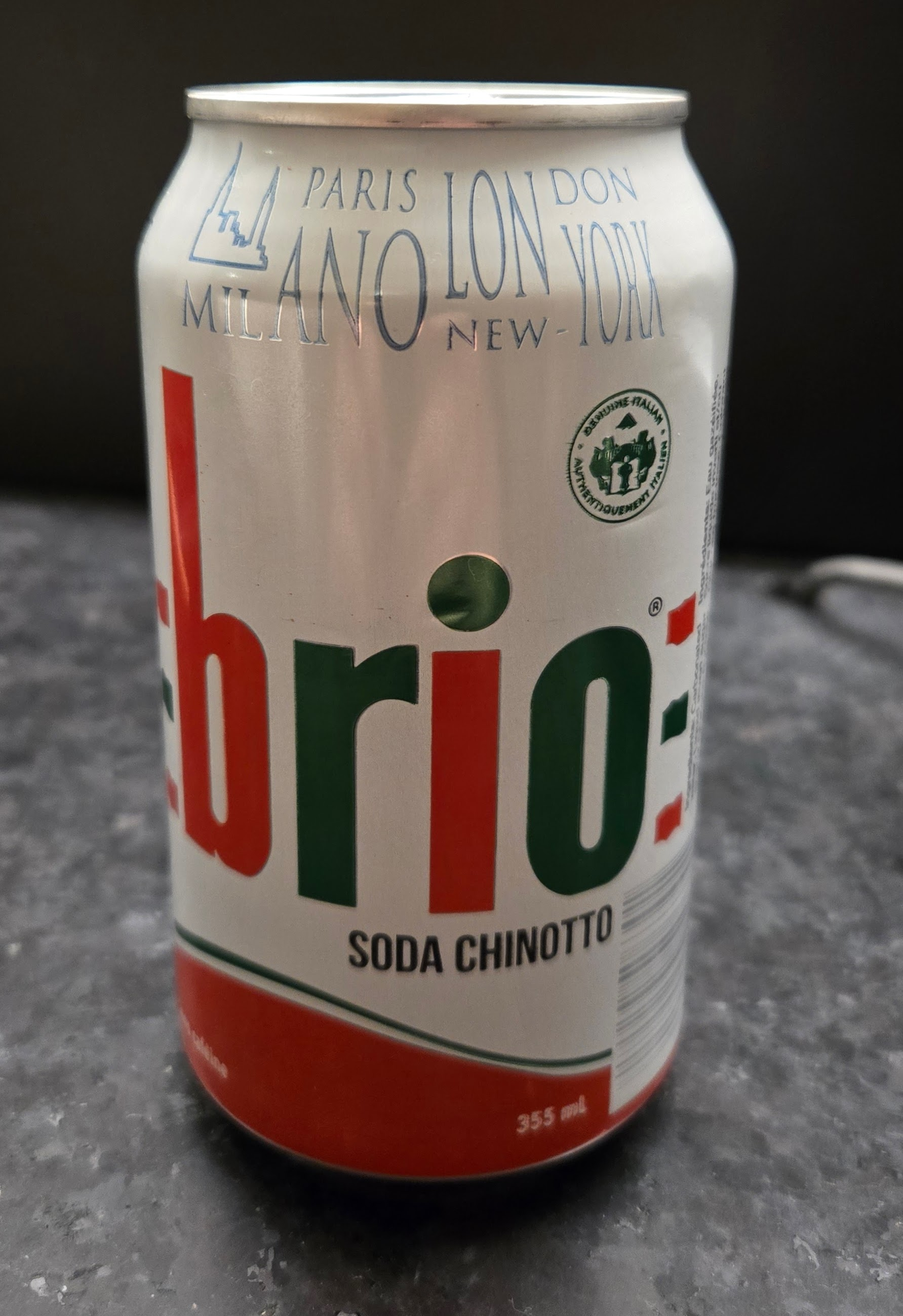

The graphic design of the can has remained similar to the original mid-century design, using red and green lowercase sans-serif type on a white background reminiscent of the Flag of Italy.
