= Citrus × vulgaris =

Citrus × vulgaris can refer to:

- Citrus × vulgaris Ferrarius ex Mill., a synonym of Citrus × limon (L.) Osbeck, lemon
- Citrus × vulgaris Risso, a synonym of Citrus × aurantium L., bitter orange
