= CVV =

CVV may refer to:

- The abbreviation for Aircraft Carrier (Medium), an American design for a conventional-powered aircraft carrier proposed in the 1970s
- Cache Valley Virus, a disease affecting ruminants in North America
- Card Verification Value, also known as card security code, a security feature for credit and debit cards
- Carl Van Vechten (1880–1964), Harlem Renaissance photographer and portrait artist
- Chris Van Vliet (born 1983), Canadian television journalist and YouTuber
- Citrus variegation virus, a disease affecting citrus trees
- Cory V. Vidanes, commonly known as CVV, the Channel Head for ABS-CBN
