= Kinnie =

Maltese soft drink

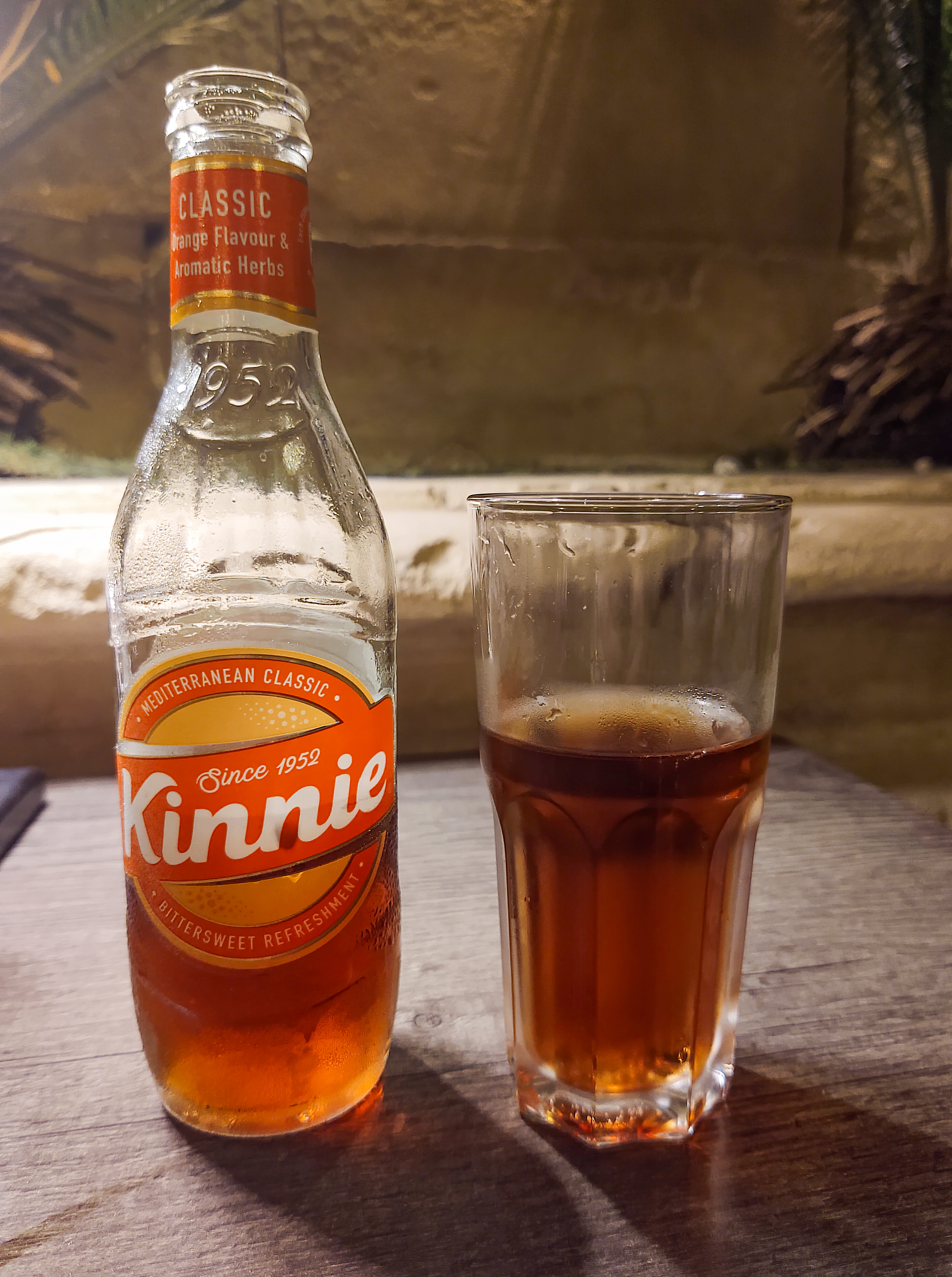
- Type: Soft drink
- Manufacturer: Simonds Farsons Cisk
- Origin: Malta
- Introduced: 1952
- Color: Amber
- Variants: Kinnie Zest; Diet Kinnie
- Related products: Krest; Chinotto; Irn-Bru; Coca-Cola; Moxie
- Website: kinnie.com

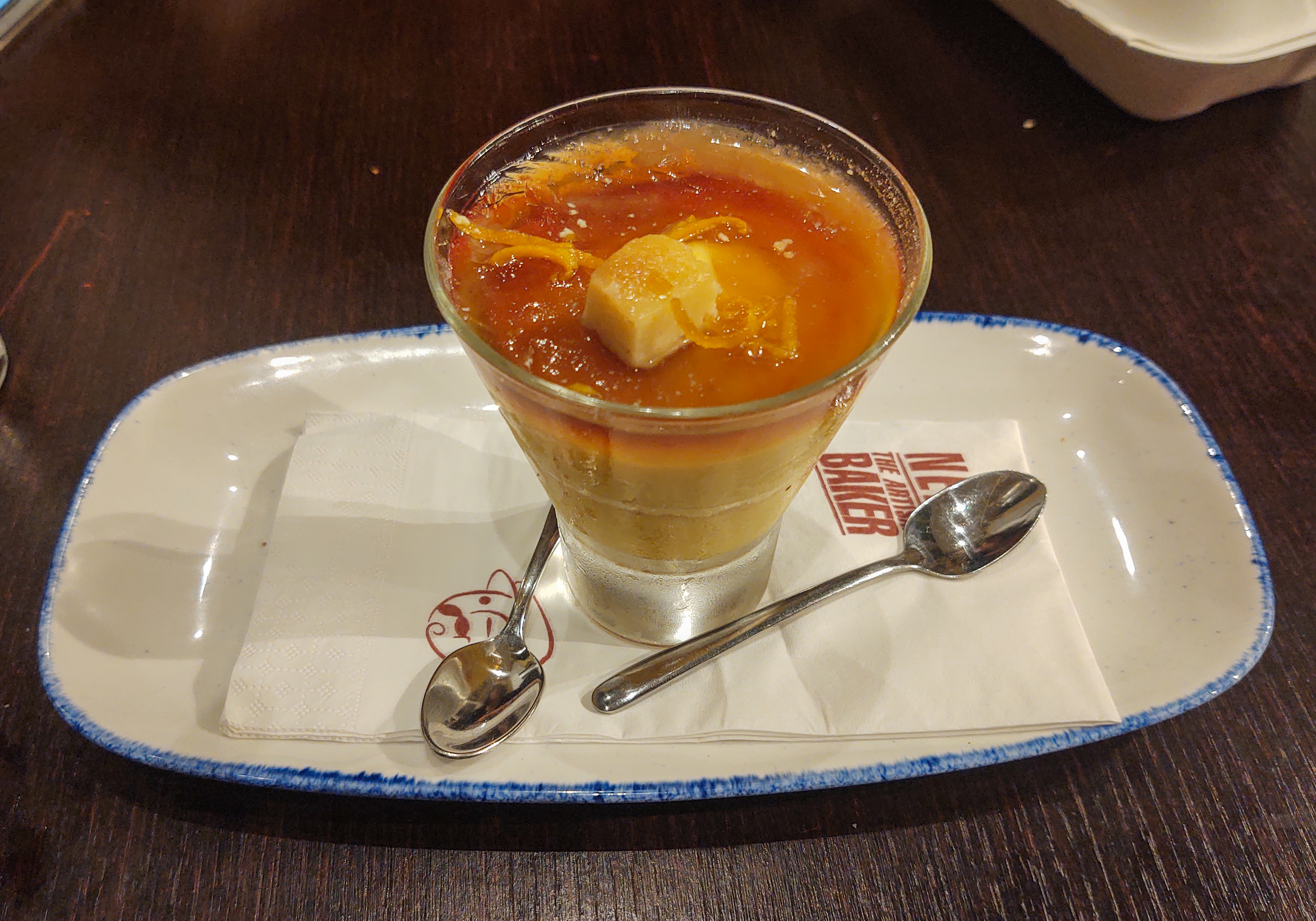
Kinnie-based dessert at a restaurant in Valletta

Kinnie (Maltese pronunciation: [ˈkɪnːɪ]) is a Maltese bittersweet carbonated soft drink brewed from bitter oranges and extracts of wormwood. It was first introduced in 1952 by the brewery Simonds Farsons Cisk, and continues to be produced by Farsons in Mrieħel, Birkirkara, Malta.

Kinnie is brown, and is drunk straight or mixed with alcohol. It holds a reputation for being Malta's favourite non-alcoholic beverage, sometimes even called the 'national soft drink'.

== History ==
Kinnie was invented by Simonds Farsons Cisk's managing director Anthony Miceli Farrugia and was first produced in 1952 as an alternative to the cola drinks that proliferated in post-war Europe, specifically Coca-Cola. Its taste was deliberately kept different from its international competition due to branding reasons. In 1975, it became the soft drink of the year of the French Comité International d'Action Gastronomique et Touristique.

Kinnie's recipe is kept secret, though it is speculated to contain ginseng and rhubarb.

A Diet version for Kinnie appeared in 1984. In 2007, a new low calorie version of Kinnie called Kinnie Zest was made available. This has a stronger orange flavour, and is advertised as only having one calorie per bottle. Simonds started selling Kinnie Vita in 2014, which is sweetened using a blend of sugar and stevia leaf extract. In April 2021, Kinnie launched an alcoholic version of the drink called 'Kinnie Spritz'.

== Sales locations ==
Kinnie is exported to the UK, Italy, Germany, Poland, the Netherlands, Libya, and Canada, while also being available in Japan.

Kinnie is produced in Birkirkara, Malta by Maltese Beverages Pty Limited, under a licence from Farsons.

In March 2009, it was announced that Farsons were going to start exporting Kinnie into Russia. In the summer of 2010, Farsons and Kinnie UK Limited soft-launched Kinnie and its two variants in London's West End, reaching almost 100 trial outlets by September 2010.

== See also ==
- Chinotto (soft drink)
