= Mal secco =

Fungal plant disease

Mal secco is a disease caused by the conidia-producing fungal plant pathogen Phoma tracheiphila. It mainly causes disease to citrus trees in the Mediterranean. In particular it causes damage to lemon trees in the Mediterranean basin. The plant pathogen, Phoma tracheiphila, is rain- and wind-disseminated.

== Disease Symptoms and Signs ==
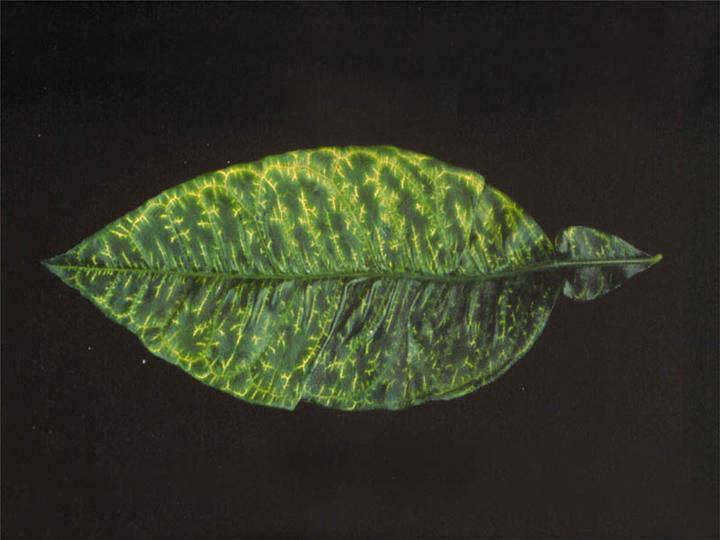
A lemon leaf showing chlorosis around the veins

Symptoms normally appear early in the spring as chlorosis of the shoot and leaf vein. There is also epinasty, or bent out and downwards, of the young leaves in the spring. This is followed by wilt and die back of leaves, twigs and branches. In most cases dieback is sectorial. Symptoms start out by resembling frost damage of the leaves and gradually progress to leaf and stem dieback. A salmon, pink, or red color develops in the wood due to the xylem producing a gum to prevent further damage. Flask shaped pycnidia are barely visible as black spots in the center of grey areas though hard to distinguish due to their placement in cortical tissues. Pycnidia are not arranged in a distinguishable pattern instead they are scattered sporadically. Severity of disease and symptoms depends on the age of a tree. The inoculum is spread more efficiently when the roots are infected versus a leaf infection. Often only a certain section of the canopy is infected until it gradually progresses basipetally.

== Hosts ==
The main host of mal secco is the lemon; however other genera including Citrus, Severina, Fortunella, and Poncirus have all been reported to be susceptible. In addition to lemon, the disease has been observed to be highly destructive in Citron (C. medica L.), lime (C. latifolia Tan.), and bergamot (C. bergamia Risso). The most common lemons in the Mediterranean, the rough lemon (C. jambiri Lush), volkamer lemon (C. volkameriana Ten. & Pasq.), and alemow (C. macrophilla wester) are very susceptible.

== Environment ==
Infection is favored by frost, hail, and wind as well as other ways that create wounds to the plant. Infection occurs at a moderate temperature between 14 and 28 °C. Optimum temperature for growth of pathogen is higher at a range of 20-25 °C. A high relative humidity favors production of conidia and further infection.

== Life cycle ==
The plant pathogen enters wounds of the leaves, branches and roots. Infection normally occurs during winter months, though the optimum temperature for pathogen growth is 25 °C. The infectious unit is conidia that can be produced on withered twigs or borne on hyphae that reside on exposed woody surfaces. Conidia are an asexual stage and do not require fertilization. Conidia are then dispersed by water where they infect natural openings. In some cases it is also probable that the pathogen is transmitted through contaminated pruning tools. In rare cases, the fungus is known become airborne over short distances. There is no known teleomorph stage or sexual stage. The pathogen creates a systemic infection since it is a vascular disease. The pathogen is often associated with a secondary invader called Glomerella cingulate. The acervuli of Glomerella cingulate are often associated with conidia Phoma tracheiphila.

== Management ==
The disease can be destroyed by burning infected plants. It was mandated by the government in Italy in 1998 that infected plant material must be uprooted and burned. It can also be controlled by pruning infected twigs when symptoms first appear. Copper fungicides and ziram have been used in nurseries to control for the disease. Cultural practices that cause injury and cultivation of the orchard in the autumn must be avoided to lessen the likelihood of wounding trees. Another effected mechanism of management is planting resistant varieties of citrus trees. Additionally, the crystalline compound nobiletin has been found to exhibit strong fungistatic activity. In an experiment where seedlings were inoculated with the pathogen that contained nobiletin prevented the appearance of disease. Nobiletin is a compound that is produced in the peel of tangerines.

== Pathogenesis ==
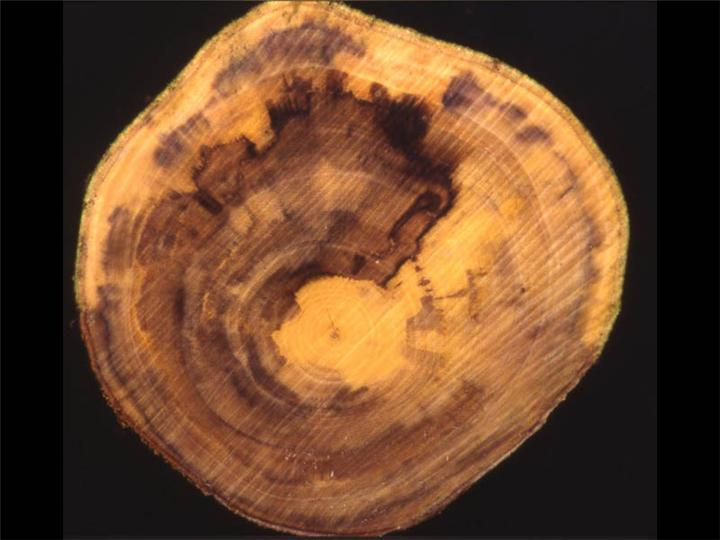
Cross section of an infected branch.

There is a direct correlation between colonization of xylem and susceptibility to Mal secco. The fungus emerges from xylem vessels and colonizes neighboring vascular tissues. In response, the host reacts by producing gum in the xylem which further clogs the xylem preventing water and solute transport. Due to clogging of the xylem water stress symptoms appear. It has been found that toxic substances produced by P. tracheiphila play a role in pathogenesis. In a study done in Israel it was found by Nachmias et al. that an extracellular glycopeptidic substance was phytotoxic and caused disease. This toxin was later classified as a vivotoxin called malseccin. The chemical nature of these chemicals toxins has not been determined.

== Importance ==
The disease Mal secco, produced by Phoma tracheiphila, has a negative impact on citrus growers in the Mediterranean. It is the most destructive disease to lemons in the Mediterranean. It is proposed that complete control of the pathogen would double lemon harvests in affected areas. It was estimated that in 15 years after being first noticed in Sicily, about 3,000 ha of lemon orchards were destroyed. Around 60-100% of trees planted were affected within 20 to 25 years of planting in Greece. In 1991, the incidence rate of Mal secco was around 30% which resulted in 20% to 30% decrease in yield. In more conducive conditions, up to 60% decrease in yield was reported.
