= Citrus black spot =

Fungal disease that affects citrus fruit

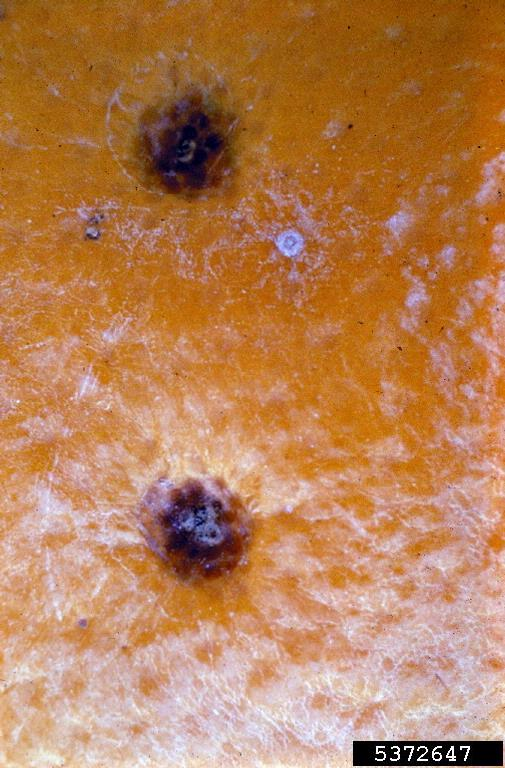
- Citrus black spot lesions
- Causal agents: Phyllosticta citricarpa
- Hosts: Citrus
- EPPO Code: GUIGCI

Citrus black spot is a fungal disease caused by Phyllosticta citricarpa(previously known as Guignardia citricarpa). This Ascomycete fungus affects citrus plants throughout subtropical climates, causing a reduction in both fruit quantity and quality.

Symptoms include both fruit and leaf lesions, the latter being critical to inter-tree dispersal. Strict regulation and management is necessary to control this disease since there are currently not many citrus varieties that are resistant.

Citrus black spot

Scientific classification
- Kingdom: Fungi
- Division: Ascomycota
- Class: Dothideomycetes
- Order: Botryosphaeriales
- Family: Phyllostictaceae
- Genus: Phyllosticta
- Species: P. citricarpa

Binomial name
- Phyllosticta citricarpa Kiely, (1948)

Synonyms
- Phoma citricarpa McAlpine, (1899); Phoma citricarpa var. mikan Hara; Phyllosticta citricarpa (McAlpine) Aa, (1973); Phyllostictina citricarpa (McAlpine) Petr., (1953)

== Fungus ==
Phyllosticta citricarpa is a plant pathogen, some strains of which cause a leaf condition called black spot on citrus plants. As a result, such strains are subject to phytosanitary legislation in the European Union and the United States.

Metabolite secreted by P. citricarpa have an inhibitory growth effect on some endophytic bacterial species, and stimulatory growth effect on others.

An isolate of P. citricarpa was found to produce the medically important compound, taxol under certain growth conditions.

== Origin ==
Citrus Black Spot was first found in Sydney, Australia, in 1895 and then appeared in South Africa along the coast of Natal in 1929. It can be found in many countries around the world. These countries include: Argentina, Australia, Brazil, China, Ghana, Mozambique, Philippines, South Africa, Sub-Saharan Africa, Taiwan, The United States and Uruguay. Whether or not Citrus Black Spot is present in Japan and New Zealand is controversial. In both countries the fungus was thought to have been found, but after further testing it was identified as the non-pathogenic strain, Phyllosticta capitalensis, rather than the pathogenic strain Phyllosticta citricarpa which causes Citrus Black Spot. The disease was first reported in North America during March 2010, in Collier and Hendry counties of southern Florida. The range of the disease in North America has remained limited to Southern Florida at present. Florida has taken measures to try to control this disease, however, it is expected to rapidly spread to other areas over the next few years.

== Hosts ==
Phyllosticta citricarpa infects mostly citrus plants. However, this fungus is also seen to infect other plants such as golden apple, mango and guava as well. There are some plants that are more susceptible to the pathogen than others. Lemon and late maturing citrus, such as Valencia orange, are the most susceptible hosts.

Moderately susceptible hosts are Hamlin sweet oranges, tangerine/ mandarin type fruit, and grapefruit.

Though there are some hosts that are more susceptible to Citrus Black Spot than others, any citrus plant that is nutritionally stressed increases its chances of infection.

== Fruit symptoms and signs ==
Symptoms of Citrus black spot vary widely and have different names to best describe the symptoms.

=== Hard spot lesions ===
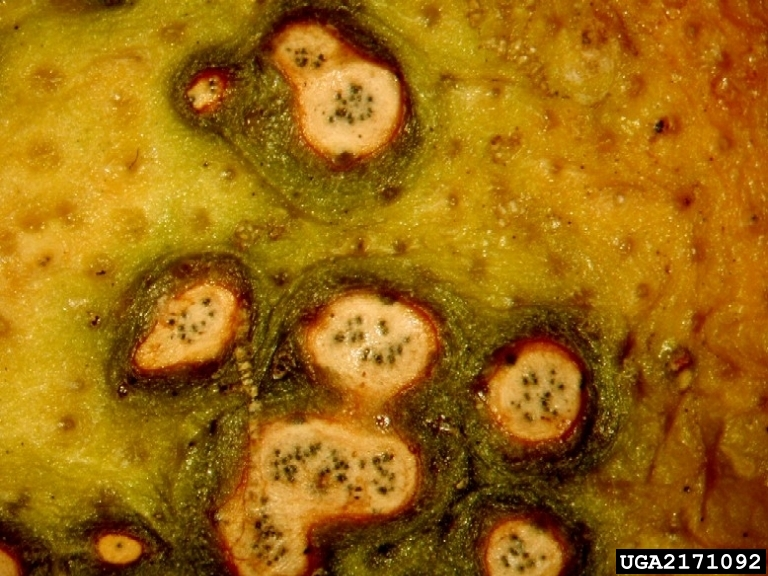
Hard spot lesions on an orange host

Hard spots are the most common lesions. They are small, round, and sunken. The average diameter of hard spot lesions ranges from 3–10 mm (.12-.4 in). They have dark red to chocolate brown margins and often have pycnidia in the gray-colored centers. A green halo may be present around the lesion.

=== False melanose lesions ===
False melanose symptoms can appear on unripe fruit early in the season. They are characterized by many small, tan to chocolate brown, slightly raised lesions. The lesions are much smaller than the hard spot variety with an average diameter of less than 1 mm (.04 in). They are difficult to observe later in the season. Unlike hard spot lesions, no pycnidia (asexual fruiting bodies) are present.

=== Cracked spot lesions ===
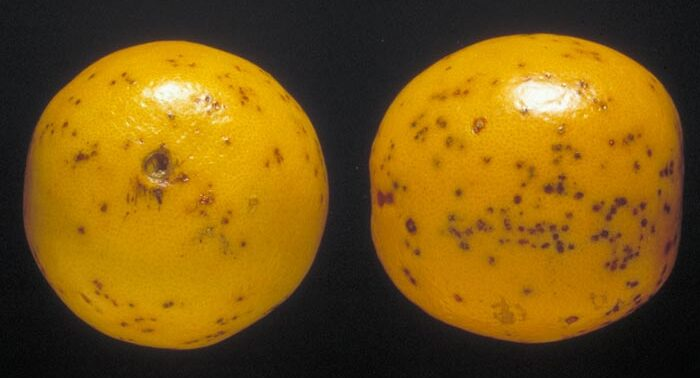
Cracked spot lesions on a Valencia orange

These lesions occur on both unripe and ripe fruit. They are large, slightly raised, dark brown spots. Cracked spot lesions do not contain pycnidia. They create raised cracks on the fruit surface that can be difficult to see later in the season. Studies have suggested a possible interaction between cracked spot lesions and rust mite colonization.

=== Freckle spot lesions ===
Freckle spot lesions are the early form of virulent spot lesions. They are small, reddish, irregularly shaped, and contain many pycnidia. These lesions are most noticeable during the end of the season, as they are found on mature fruit and during post-harvest storage.

=== Virulent spot lesions ===
The mature stage of freckle spot lesions, they are found on mature fruit and during post-harvest storage. They are similar in appearance to the freckle spot lesions, but under high humidity can cover the entire fruit. Because of this direct damage to the fruit, this type of lesion can be economically devastating.

== Leaf symptoms ==
Leaf symptoms are generally observed on highly susceptible citrus varieties, such as lemons, as well in poorly managed orchards. The symptoms generally develop from latent infections after the leaves have died. Red-brown, pin-point dots may develop into larger, circular necrotic lesions with gray centers and red or brown margins.

== Diagnosis ==
To confirm a diagnosis of Citrus Black Spot, the pathogenic fungus must be isolated in culture. This can be difficult, as culturing of the fruit lesions takes up to 14 days with an efficacy of less than 10%. Diagnosis is also complicated by the morphological similarities of the fungal structures to the non-pathogenic strain Phyllosticta capitalensis (formerly referred to as Guignarida mangiferae). The two species can be distinguished by molecular testing using PCR.

== Life cycle ==
After overwintering in leaf debris, ascostroma begin producing ascospores. Ascospore formation is accelerated by sequential wetting and drying of the leaf litter. However, very wet conditions inhibit ascospore development due to leaf decomposition and competition from saprophytes. The ascospores are ejected from the fruiting bodies of the fungus during rainfall or irrigation and then dispersed by wind and water. Upon landing on susceptible tissue, the ascospores germinate and form appresoria after a 24-48 hour wetting period. (Different tissues are susceptible to infection at different times. Leaves are susceptible up to 10 months of age. Fruits are susceptible during the 4–5 months after fruitset, though trees less than ten years old are only susceptible up to 3 months .) Soon after, the infection peg along with mycelia colonize the area between the cuticle and epidermal wall. The symptoms are not visible right away because the infection remains latent, or dormant, until the fruit is mature.

The infection in leaves usually remains latent until the leaves drop, but leaf spots may be found on older leaves. The leaf lesions usually produce ascospores, but sometimes produce pycnidia. These pycnidia release pycnidiospores (conidia) in a gelatinous mass. Under wet conditions, the gelatinous mass dissolves and the spores are dispersed by splashes of water. This splash-dispersal method limits reinfection to nearby fruit or leaves of the same tree. Fruit infections remain latent until fruit maturity. Upon maturing, the mycelium grows into the outer rind, also known as a flavedo. Here in the flavedo, circular lesions form, which are sometimes accompanied by pycnidia. While ascospores can infect fruit, they have not yet been observed developing on fruit.

== Management ==
There is no resistance to Citrus Black Spot and once a tree has been infected there is no known cure causing tree removal to be the best option. Both federal and state governments have recommended the following preventative measures. To control Guignardia citriparpa fungicides like copper and/or strobilurins should be applied monthly from early May to the middle of September (in the northern hemisphere). Applications of the fungicides are recommended in early April (northern hemisphere) if that month has experienced more rainfall than usual resulting in the ideal conditions for citrus black spot to form.

Table 1. Recommended Chemical Controls for Citrus Black Spot

Pesticide	FRAC MOA2	Mature Trees Rate/Acre1
copper fungicide	M1	use label rate
Abound 2.08F3	11	12.4-15.4 fl oz. Do not apply more than 92.3 fl oz/acre/season for all uses. Best applied with petroleum oil.
Gem 25WG3	11	4.0-8.0 oz. Do not apply more than 32 oz/acre/season for all uses.
Gem 500 SC3	11	1.9-3.8 fl oz. Do not apply more than 15.2 fl oz/acre/season for all uses. Best applied with petroleum oil.
Headline3	11	9-12 fl oz. Do not apply more than 54 fl oz/acre/season for all uses. Best applied with petroleum oil.

1)Lower rates can be used on smaller trees. Do not use less than minimum label rate.

2)Mode of action class for citrus pesticides from the Fungicide Resistance Action Committee (FRAC) 20111. Refer to ENY-624, "Pesticide Resistance and Resistance Management," in the 2012 Florida Citrus Pest Management Guide for more details.

3)Do not use more than 4 applications of strobilurin fungicides/season. Do not make more than 2 sequential applications of strobilurin fungicides.

Another method of control is to accelerate the leaf litter decomposition under the trees in citrus groves. Accelerating this decomposition reduces the chance for ascospore inoculation which generally takes place in the middle of March. There are three possible methods to hasten this decomposition. One method is to increase the microsprinkler irrigation in the grove to half an hour for at least five days of the week. This form of control should continue for about a month and a half. The second method is to apply urea or ammonium to the leaf litter. The last and final method to accelerate leaf decomposition is to apply lime or calcium carbonate to the litter. Urea, lime, and calcium carbonate reduce the number of fungal structures and spore production. Since the fungus requires wet conditions to thrive, air flow in the citrus grove should be maximized to reduce leaf wetness.

Along with these methods it is also important to get rid of debris such as fallen fruit or twigs in a manner that reduces the chances of infecting other plants. Citrus Black Spot can colonize and reproduce on dead twigs. To dispose of citrus debris it should either be heated to a minimum of 180 °F for two hours, incinerated, buried in a landfill, or fed to livestock. Plant trash should be moved with caution if at all to avoid spreading the infectious ascospores. Any trees that are infected with citrus black spot should be removed from the grove and disposed of. These trees must be removed because those that are declining and stressed will often have off season bloom. If there is more than one age of fruit present on the tree, it is possible for the asexual spores on the older fruits to be transferred to young fruits, thereby intensifying the disease. This off season blooming is often more problematic with Valencia oranges when old and new crops overlap; therefore fruits should be harvested before blooming commences.

== Importance ==
Citrus Black Spot has a large economic impact on many countries because the black blemishes make it undesirable for human consumption and therefore the infected fruit cannot be sold. This type of economic impact is felt most in Australia and South Africa where the disease has been present for a number of years. In Australia, South Africa, and China citrus is of particular importance due to the large role it plays in international trade. A few black spots on as little as one piece of fruit can cause the entire shipment to be rejected. When this happens the shipment usually has to be repackaged and resold to a less sensitive market which leads to large financial losses. Along with making fruit unsuitable for sale Citrus Black Spot also causes early fruit drop and reduces crop yield. The reduction in fruit value due to Citrus Black Spot is estimated at 20-30%.

At the end of 2013, the European Commission announced a ban on most imports of citrus fruit from South Africa because of concerns about the possible transmission of Citrus Black Spot to the EU. This ban was justified by a study by the European Food Safety Authority (EFSA) on the risk of transmission. However, a specially convened panel of eminent scientists from Brazil, Argentina, the USA, Uruguay, Australia and South Africa concluded that there is no risk of transmission through fruit to European climates. It argued that Citrus Black Spot has never spread to new areas with fruit as the cause and citrus fruit has never been shown to be the cause of the spread of the disease. The panel pointed out that it is known to occur only in summer rainfall citrus production areas and that the only way it has been spread to new areas has been through infected propagation material moved to areas where the climate is suitable for its establishment.

== See also ==
- List of citrus diseases
