= Oidium tingitaninum =

Scientific classification
- Kingdom: Fungi
- Division: Ascomycota
- Class: Leotiomycetes
- Order: Helotiales
- Family: Erysiphaceae
- Genus: Oidium
- Species: O. tingitaninum

Binomial name
- Oidium tingitaninum J.C. Carter, (1915)

Species of fungus

Oidium tingitaninum is a plant pathogen affecting citrus.

== See also ==
- List of citrus diseases
