= Black rot =

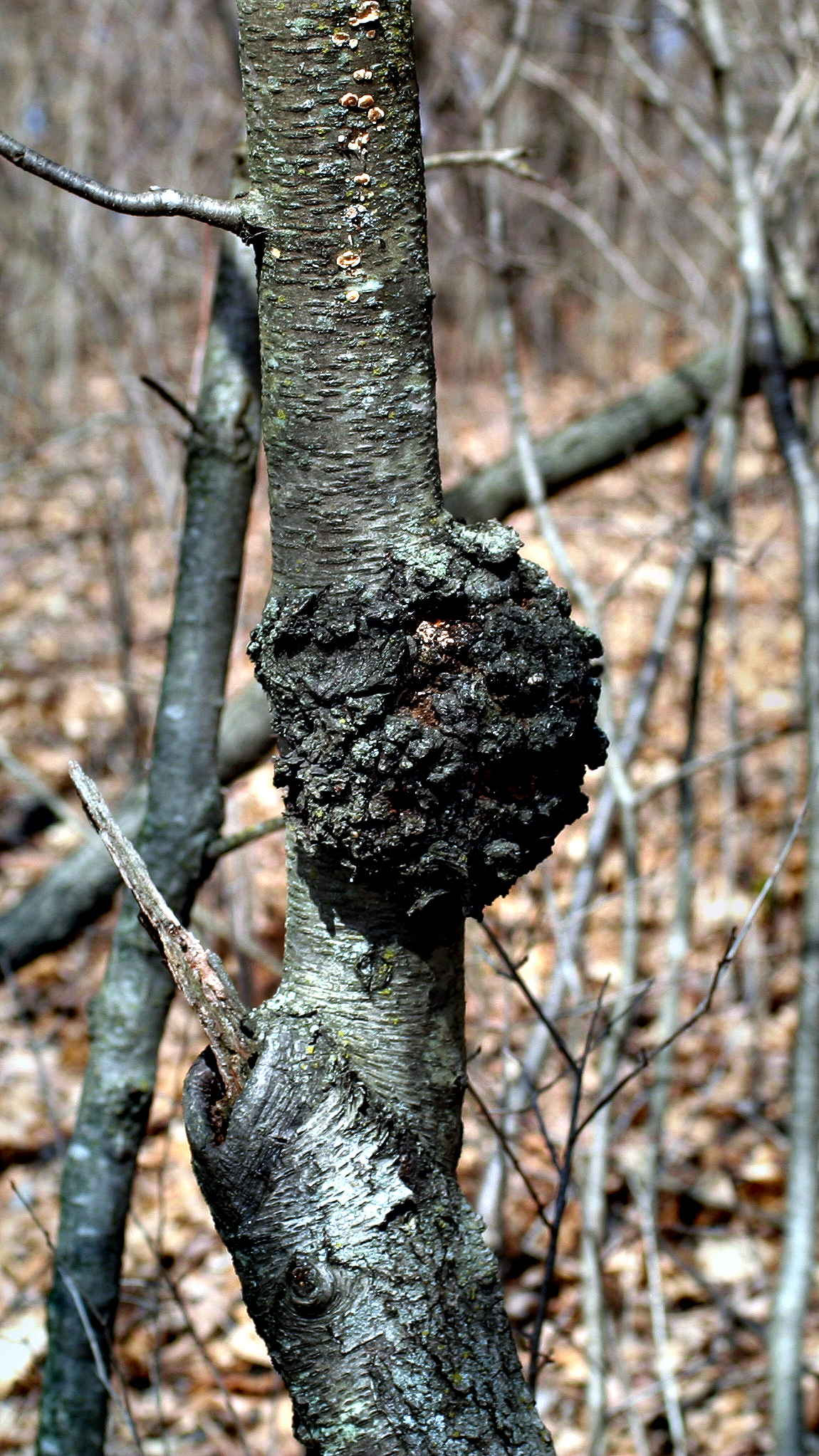
Prunus black rot on a black cherry tree

Black rot is a name used for various diseases of cultivated plants caused by fungi or bacteria, producing dark brown discoloration and decay in the leaves of fruit and vegetables:

- A disease of the apple, pear and quince caused by a fungus (Botryosphaeria obtusa or Physalospora cydoniae)
- A disease of grape vines caused by a fungus (Guignardia bidwellii), affecting the aboveground part of the vine, and favored by warm, humid weather; also called grape rot
- A disease of cabbage and related plants caused by a bacterium known as Xanthomonas campestris (Xanthomonas campestris pv. campestris). Occurring around the world, it affects primarily the aboveground parts of plants. Vegetables in the crucifer family are susceptible, including broccoli, Brussels sprouts, cabbage, cauliflower, Chinese cabbage, kale, mustard, radish, rutabaga, and turnip. Many weeds may host this pathogen including shepherd's purse, wild mustard, and yellow rocket.
- A disease of the potato caused by a bacterium (Erwinia atroseptica)
- A disease of citrus plants caused by a fungus ( Alternaria citri )
- A disease of the sweet potato caused by a fungus (Ceratostomella fimbriata)
