= Phoma tracheiphila =

Scientific classification
- Domain: Eukaryota
- Kingdom: Fungi
- Division: Ascomycota
- Class: Dothideomycetes
- Order: Pleosporales
- Family: Didymellaceae
- Genus: Phoma
- Species: P. tracheiphila

Binomial name
- Phoma tracheiphila (Petri) L.A. Kantsch. & Gikaschvili (1948)

Synonyms
- Bakerophoma tracheiphila (Petri) Cif. (1946); Deuterophoma tracheiphila Petri (1929)

Species of fungus

Phoma tracheiphila is a fungal plant pathogen. It causes a disease known as Mal secco on citrus trees. It occurs in dry, cool climates such as the Mediterranean, Black Sea and Asia Minor. It forms pycniospores that are carried short distances by rain, or by wind to new leaves, where germinated hyphae invade stomata or more likely fresh wounds.

== See also ==
- List of citrus diseases
