= Simonds Farsons Cisk =

Food and beverage conglomerate based in Birkirkara, Malta

Simonds Farsons Cisk plc
- Company type: Public limited company
- Traded as: MSE: SFC
- ISIN: MT0000070103
- Industry: Food and beverage
- Founded: 1928; 98 years ago in Ħamrun, Malta
- Founders: Luigi Farrugia (l. Farrugia & Sons (Farsons)); Henry & George Simonds (H&G Simonds Malta); John Scicluna (Malta Export Brewery (Cisk))
- Headquarters: Birkirkara, Malta
- Area served: Malta
- Divisions: Farsonsdirect; Farsons Beverage Imports; Food Chain Limited; Quintano Foods; EcoPure
- Website: www.farsons.com

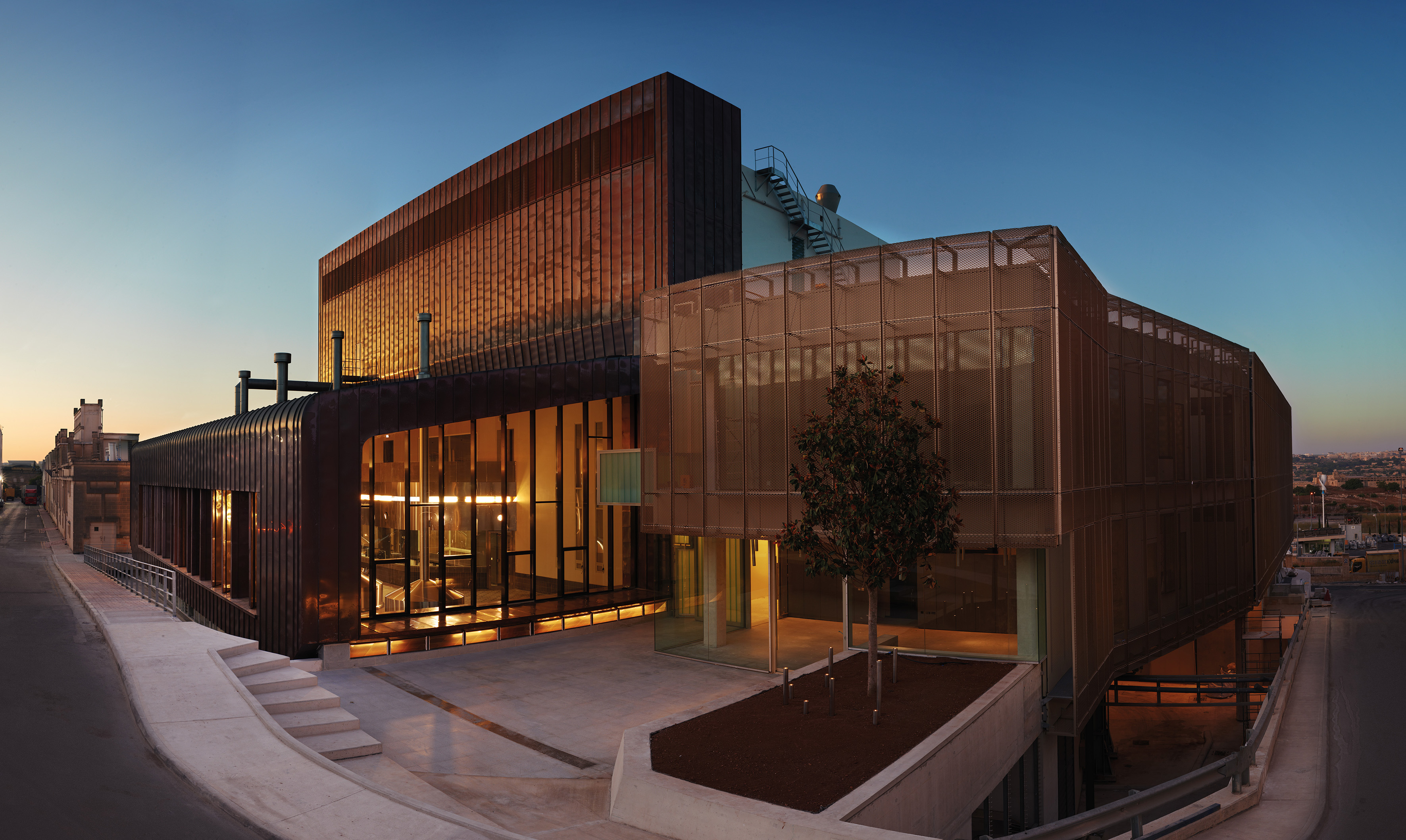
Farsons Brewery

Simonds Farsons Cisk plc, commonly known as Farsons, is a Maltese food and beverage conglomerate whose businesses include the brewing, sale and distribution of beer and soft drinks; importation, wholesale and retail of food and beverages; operation of franchised food retailers; and property development.

== History ==
Established in 1928, Farsons was the first brewery to be established on the island, in the town of Ħamrun, near the capital city Valletta. The brewery's first beer was Farsons Pale Ale, brewed to meet the preferences of the British garrison and navy stationed in Malta at the time. In 1929, Farsons merged with the H.G Simonds brewery from Reading to establish Simonds Farsons Ltd.

In the same year and a short distance from the Farsons brewery, the Marquis John Scicluna, whose family had established the first privately owned local bank, opened the Malta Export Brewery. While Simonds Farsons Ltd had been granted the licence to brew ales, the Malta Export Brewery was granted a temporary exclusive licence to brew Bavarian-style lagers under the names Cisk Pilsner and Cisk Munchener.

Following twenty years of rivalry, the Malta Export Brewery merged with Simonds Farsons Ltd in 1948 to form the company Simonds Farsons Cisk Ltd which soon after diversified its product portfolio and interests.

== Beers ==
Farsons beers include lagers, ales and stouts. Its lager range includes Cisk, Cisk Export (Premium Lager), Cisk Pilsner (Premium German style Pils), Cisk Extra Strong Lager, Cisk Excel (Low Carb Lager, made with soy), Cisk Chill Range (Lemon, Berry and Ginger Lime Lager). Other beers include Hopleaf Pale Ale, Farsons Double Red strong ale, Farsons India Pale Ale, Blue Label Light Mild, Lacto Milk Stout, Traditional Shandy, as well as Carlsberg, Skol and Budweiser under licence. The company also has a "Smooth 'n' Creamy" draught and can variants of Blue Label. Cisk Lager, Cisk Excel, Cisk Export, Cisk Pilsner, Blue Label, are also available in 20 Litre and 30 Litre kegs for export markets.

The name "Cisk" originates from Giuseppe Scicluna's nickname "Iċ-Ċisk" which developed out of the local mispronunciation of the word "cheque" which was introduced into local circulation by the Scicluna Bank. Aside from brewing, Farsons is also the franchisee of Pepsico International and produces and packages a variety of local and international non-alcoholic beverages including its non-alcoholic citrus based bitter sweet soft drink, Kinnie. In addition to Malta, Kinnie is also produced under licence in Australia.

== Subsidiaries ==
The group represents and imports a number of international food and beverage brands which are managed by Farsons Beverage Imports Company and Quintano Foods. The group is the franchisee for Boost Juice Bars, Burger King, Pizza Hut and KFC and manages this operation through Food Chain Limited. The group is further involved in property management and development through its fully owned subsidiary Trident Developments.

== Gallery ==
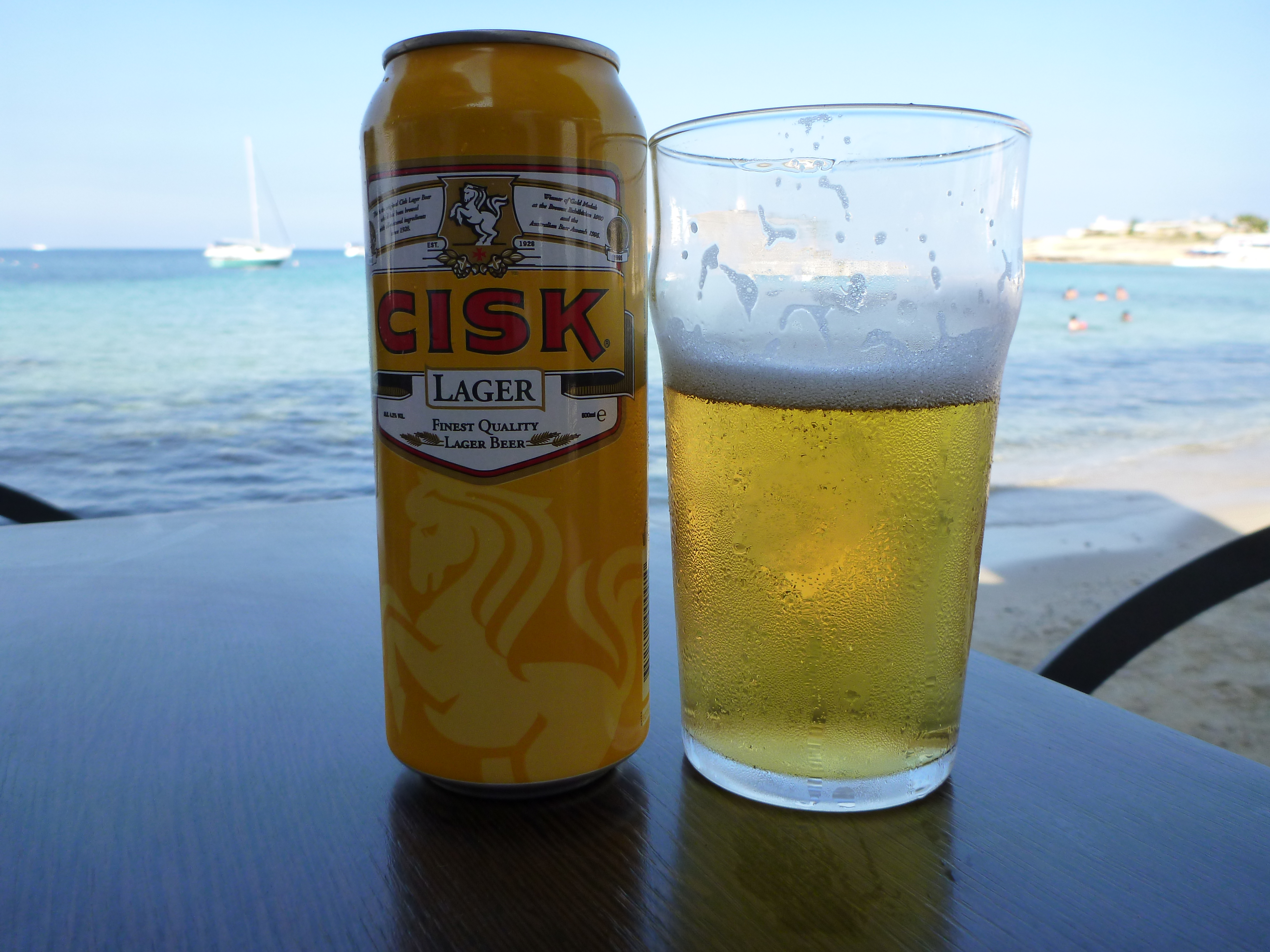
Cisk Lager

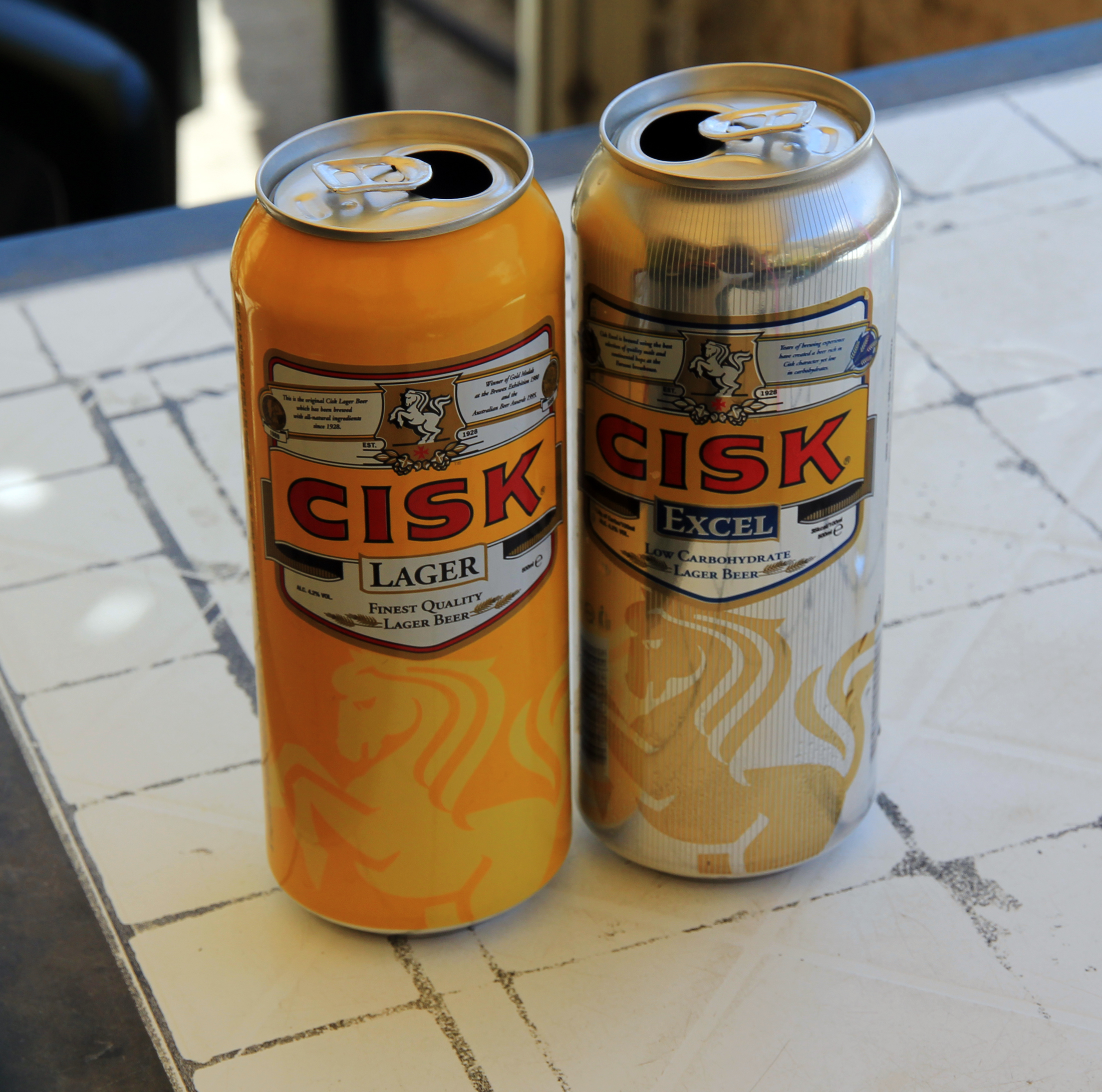
Cisk Lager and Cisk Excel

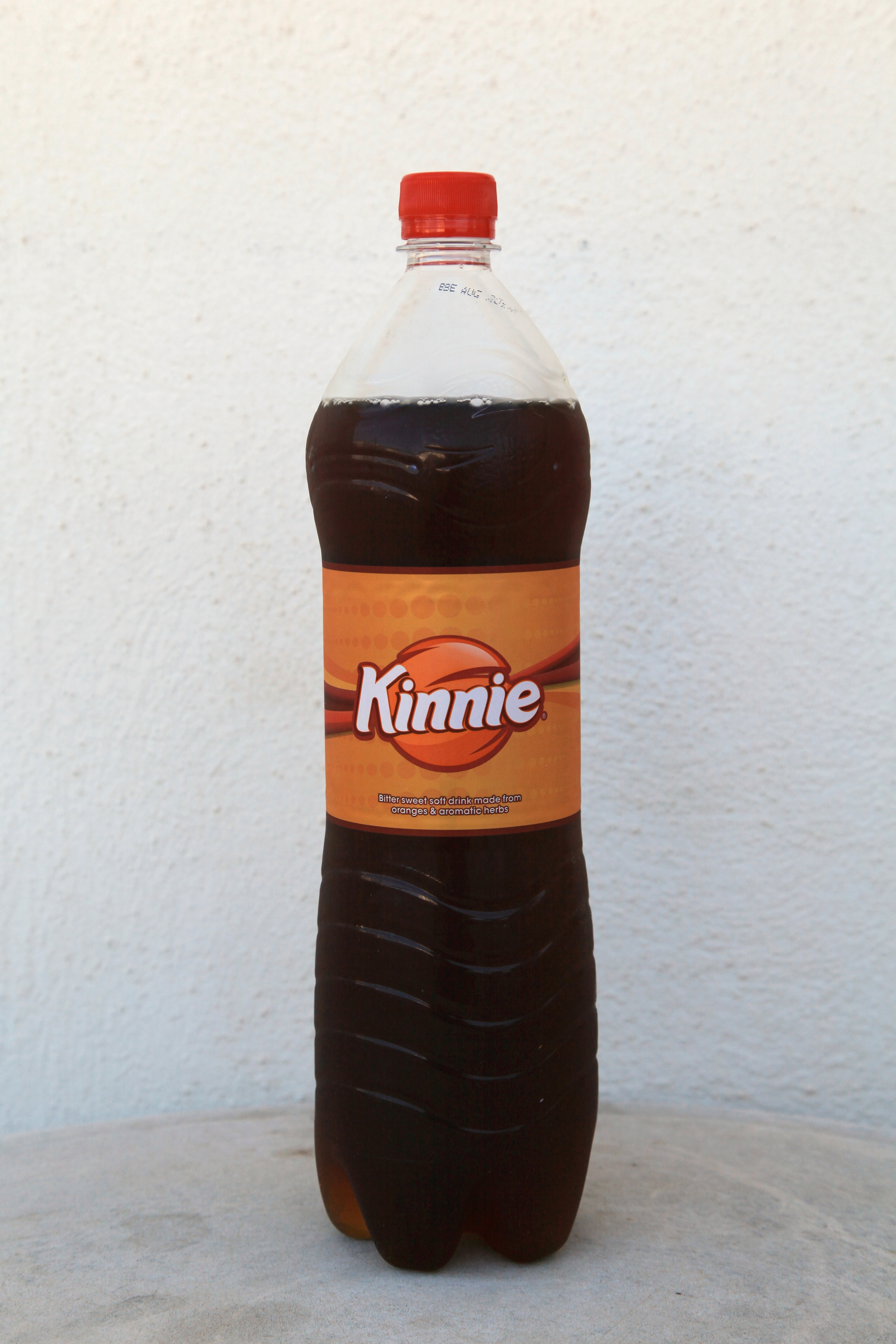
A Kinnie bottle

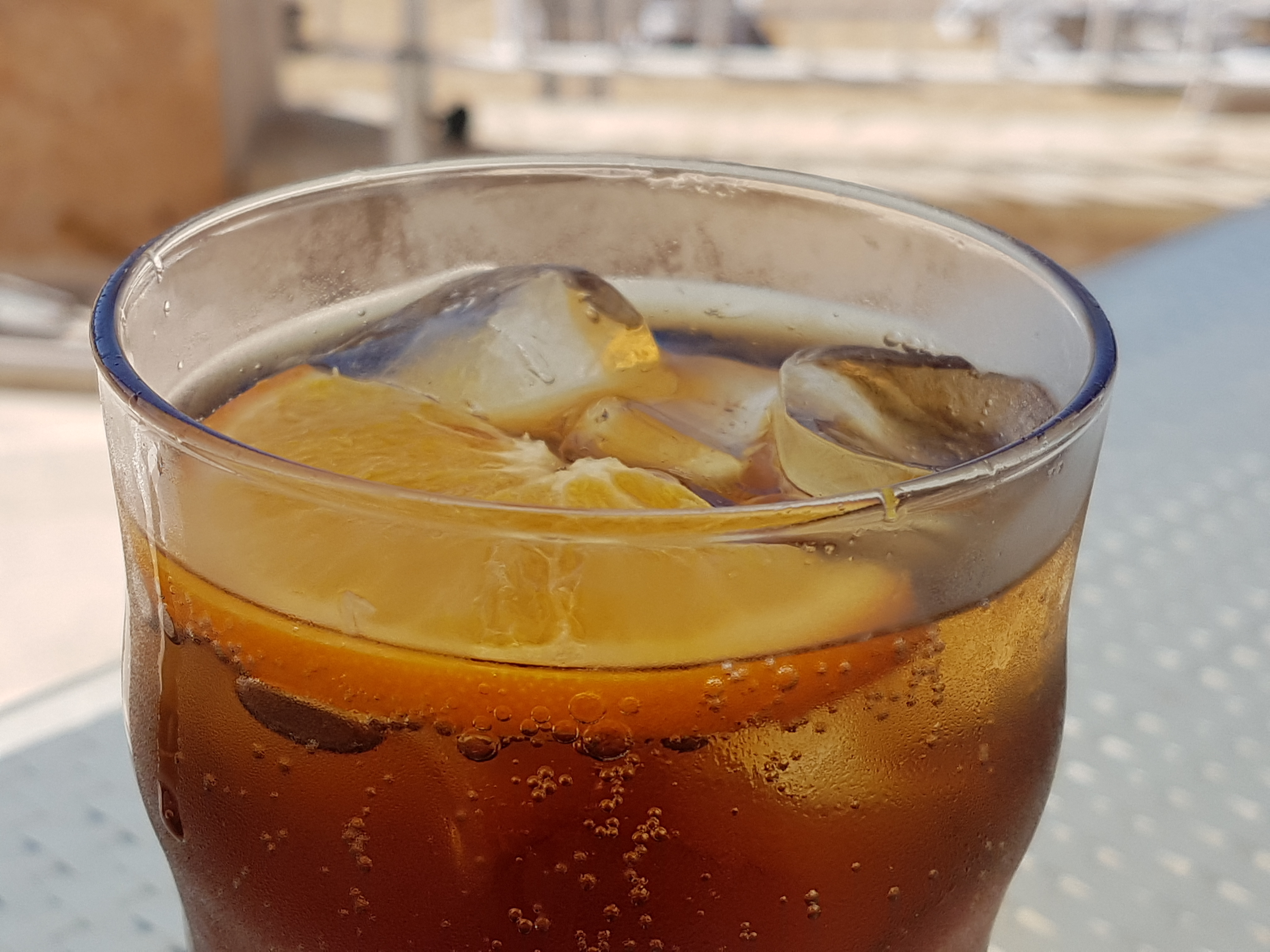
Kinnie with ice and a slice of orange
