= Chinotto (drink) =

Type of soft drink

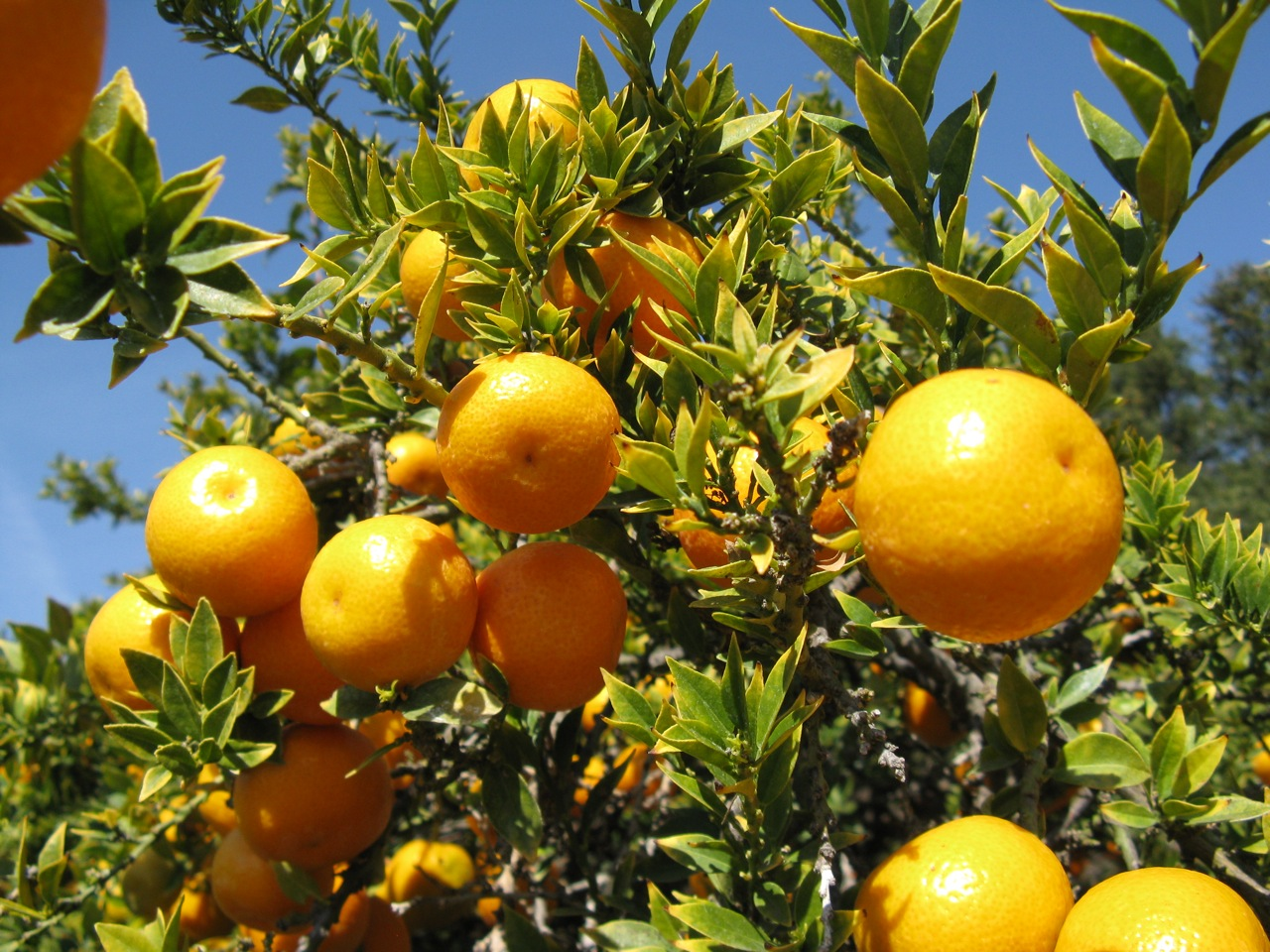
The fruit of the chinotto tree is the main flavoring agent for several brands of soda.

Chinotto (Italian: [kiˈnɔtto]) is a carbonated soft drink produced from the juice of the fruit of the myrtle-leaved orange tree (Citrus myrtifolia). The beverage is dark in color. Its appearance is similar to that of cola, but it is not as sweet, having a bittersweet taste.

The drink was known in antiquity as a dark-hued, bitter-tasting variant of orange juice, and was considered as refreshment. Industrial production of Chinotto soda dates to the 1950s. It is produced in Italy by several companies, and is mostly consumed in Italy and Malta. San Pellegrino, the mineral water company, exports it under the brand name "Chinò" and "Chinotto." Coca-Cola produces it under the brand name "Fanta Amara" in Malta.

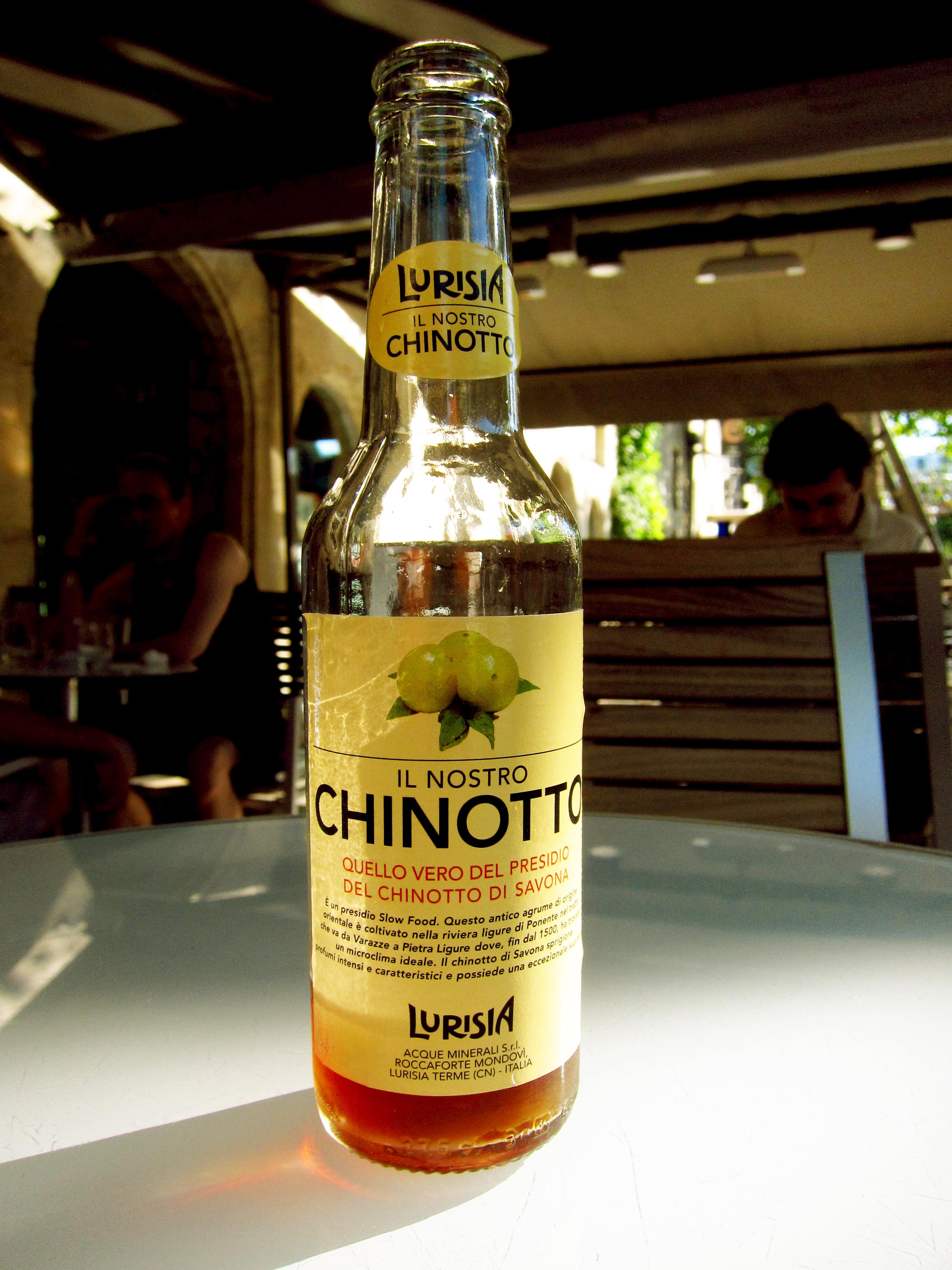
A bottle of Italian chinotto

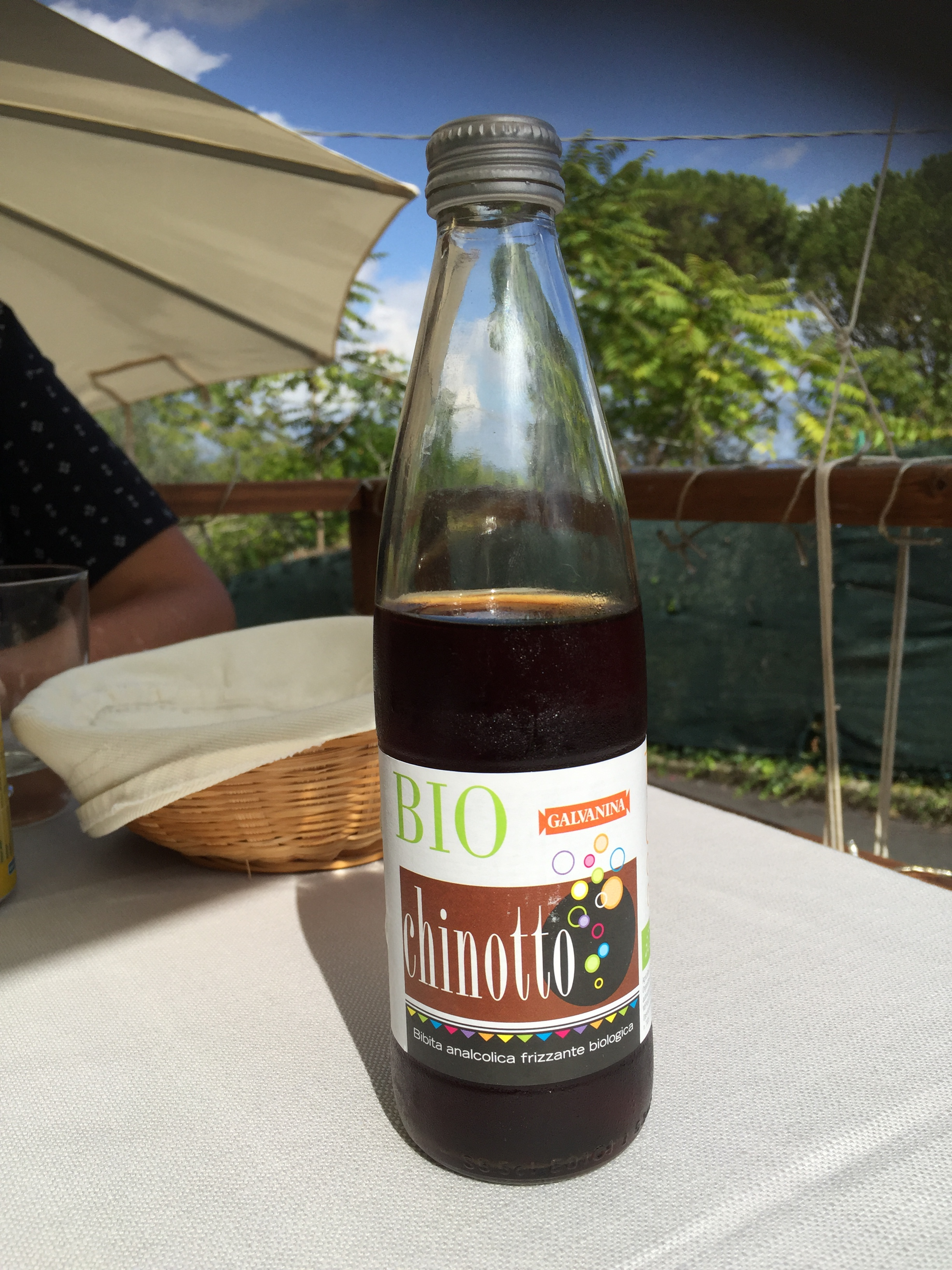
An organic version of the drink.

== Internationally ==
- The Brio brand of Canada (this is sweeter than Italian brands).
- The Bisleri brand in Australia (previously independent, but now owned & operated by Coca-Cola Amatil).
- In Venezuela, Sprite is sold under the brand name "Chinotto"; it is owned by The Coca-Cola Company.
- Kinnie is a chinotto-like soft drink made in Malta.

== See also ==
- Moxie, a U.S. soft drink with a similar bitter taste
