= Hemicycliophora =

Scientific classification
- Kingdom: Animalia
- Phylum: Nematoda
- Class: Chromadorea
- Order: Rhabditida
- Family: Hemicycliophoridae
- Genus: Hemicycliophora de Man, 1921

Genus of worms

Hemicycliophora is a genus of nematodes belonging to the family Hemicycliophoridae. They are collectively referred to as sheath nematodes.

The genus has cosmopolitan distribution.

Species:

- Hemicycliophora andrassyi Brzeski, 1974
- Hemicycliophora aquatica (Micoletzky, 1913)
- Hemicycliophora arenaria Raski, 1958
- Hemicycliophora belemnis Germani & Luc, 1973
- Hemicycliophora biformis (Chitwood & Birchfield, 1957)
- Hemicycliophora chilensis Brzeski, 1974
- Hemicycliophora conida Thorne, 1955
- Hemicycliophora diolaensis Germani & Luc, 1973
- Hemicycliophora epicharoides Loof, 1969
- Hemicycliophora floridensis (Chitwood & Birchfiled, 1957)
- Hemicycliophora fluvialis Bird, 1999
- Hemicycliophora hellenica Vovlas, 2000
- Hemicycliophora iberica Castillo et al., 1990
- Hemicycliophora italiae Brzeski & Ivanova, 1979
- Hemicycliophora labiata Colbran, 1960
- Hemicycliophora loofi Maas, 1970
- Hemicycliophora lutosa Loof & Heyns, 1969
- Hemicycliophora macristhmus Loof, 1968
- Hemicycliophora micoletzkyi Goffart, 1951
- Hemicycliophora nucleata Loof, 1968
- Hemicycliophora oostenbrinki (Luc, 1958)
- Hemicycliophora paracouensis Van Den Berg & Quénéhervé, 1995
- Hemicycliophora robusta Loof, 1968
- Hemicycliophora strenzkei Volz, 1951
- Hemicycliophora subbotini Maria, Cai, Qu, Castillo & Zheng, 2018
- Hemicycliophora thienemanni Schneider, 1925
- Hemicycliophora thornei Goodey, 1963
- Hemicycliophora triangulum Loof, 1968
- Hemicycliophora typica de Man, 1921
- Hemicycliophora wyei Cordero, Robbins & Szalanski, 2013
- Hemicycliophora zuckermani Brzeski, 1963
