= Alternaria citri =

Scientific classification
- Kingdom: Fungi
- Division: Ascomycota
- Class: Dothideomycetes
- Order: Pleosporales
- Family: Pleosporaceae
- Genus: Alternaria
- Species: A. citri

Binomial name
- Alternaria citri Ellis & N.Pierce

Species of fungus

Alternaria citri is a fungal plant pathogen that causes black rot in citrus plants.

== Host and symptoms ==
Alternaria citri is an ascomycete fungal plant pathogen that causes black rot in citrus plants. Specifically, certain lemon, lime, orange, mandarin and grapefruit species are susceptible hosts for this pathogen. The host is more susceptible to disease in climates with dry, warm summers and cool, moist winters. One symptom of the pathogen is the black rot that is produced. The black hyphae that form on the surface of the plant is a sign of the actual pathogen. While healthy and uninfected fruits will display a particular hue, a plant infected by A. citri will possess atypical and usually more brightly colored fruits which signifies presence of the pathogen.

== Disease cycle ==
Little research on the specific disease cycle of Alernaria citri has been conducted because its life cycle is so similar to Alternaria alternata. The life cycle of Alternaria alternata can be used as a proxy for information on Alternaria citri. However, Alternaria citri does not produces external signs or symptoms on leaves and stems, like Alternaria alternata. Signs and symptoms of Alternaria citri do not develop until after the fruit is harvested.

Alternaria alternata has no known resting sexual stage. Instead, it overwinters in infected plant debris through asexual spores called conidia. Their production can begin in as few as ten days after the first symptoms appear, and can continue for to up to fifty days. Because of this, the life cycle is known as poly-cyclic. Alternaria alternata's conidia disperse via air currents, and their release from the lesions can be triggered by rainfall, or even just a sudden increase in humidity. When the conidium lands on a leaf, it will wait until the nighttime dew, and then germinate. It can either enter through the stomata, or penetrate directly through the top of the leaf, using its appressorium, infecting the leaf within 12 hours.

== Environment ==
In the orchard, Alternaria citri is more likely to contaminate overripe and damaged fruit. The longer the fruit are stored, the more likely black rot will develop. Alternaria citri is more likely to be found in hot, semi-arid areas compared to humid areas. Prior experiments have shown that the pathogen can grow in a pH between 2.7 and 8.0 with 5.4 being the optimum. Alternaria citri can grow between 15 and 35 °C with 25 °C as the ideal temperature.

== Management ==
Since Alternaria citri mainly infects stressed and overripe fruit, one management practice is to prevent stress of the fruit. By keeping the fruit and plant healthy the navel is less likely to split and become infected.[1] One way to stop stress is to supply adequate amounts of plant macronutrients. To prevent over ripened fruit from getting infected, harvesting at optimum maturity is advised by clipping the fruit and not snapping it[2]. Snapping refers to the act of pulling the fruit and damaging the stalk end of the fruit. The exposed tissue of healthy fruits increased the chances of infection from diseased fruits by having a wound for the pathogen to enter. Because fungicides have proved to be unhelpful in stopping the infection of citrus fruits, the use of resistant plants have proven to be the most advantageous form of management. Resistant plants have been produced by breeding hybrid cultivars from existing resistant cultivars, irradiation, or gene modification.

== Importance ==
Alternaria citri can be found worldwide, in areas that store and produce citrus. Without proper management, the disease can lead to huge losses for citrus growers. In 1901, 10 to 30% of citrus crops in California were lost due to Alternaria citri. Another source states that in India, between 1988 and 1990, more than 20% of mandarins in transport were lost to the disease. In general, the pathogen is most commonly found in navel orange orchards as the "navel" of the orange allows for easier infection compared to other citrus fruits. The pathogen can decrease fresh market quality and interfere with juice processing. The disease can be a problem with juice companies as accidental processing of an infected fruit will leave pieces of black tissue in the juice, making the product unsellable. Another complication with black rot is the potential delay in harvest time. A common management practice is to let the infected fruits drop prematurely in order to prevent contamination of the healthy crop. However, this tactic may delay harvest beyond the optimal time for fruit maturity.

== Pathogenesis ==
Alternaria citri may infect a plant through wounds on the plant surface or through the end of the stem of the fruit at the location called a stylet where natural openings exist. Once the pathogen has entered a susceptible host, infection may begin. The infection route for the pathogen is limited to internal tissues during the growth period in the field and causes internal decay. In turn, the internal decay causes the fruits to ripen and drop prematurely. No external symptoms or signs are visible when the fruit is still attached at the stalk end during development and is completely intact without any disruption to the peel. The observable signs and symptoms occur on the peel after they drop or are harvested. This occurs because the fruits become detached from the stalk end, providing an exit route for the infection to spread to the peel that it is no longer intact. As the infection spreads further, the fruit becomes macerated, or softened, and black rot develops.

A key enzyme produced by the pathogen known as endopolygalacturonase (endoPG) is highly influential in the success of the pathogen. EndoPG is an endogenous polygalacturonase, which is a cell wall degrading enzyme that helps the pathogen take over the plant's nutrient source. A. citri that lack the ability to produce endoPG due to mutation have limited success because they are unable to penetrate through the cell wall.
