= Hemicycliophoridae =

Scientific classification
- Domain: Eukaryota
- Kingdom: Animalia
- Phylum: Nematoda
- Class: Chromadorea
- Order: Rhabditida
- Family: Hemicycliophoridae

Synonyms
- Caloosiidae

Family of worms

Hemicycliophoridae is a family of nematodes belonging to the order Rhabditida.

Genera:

- Aulosphora Siddiqi, 1980
- Caloosia Siddiqi & Goodey, 1963
- Colbranium Andrassy, 1979
- Hemicaloosia Ray & Das, 1978
- Hemicycliophora de Man, 1921
- Loofia Siddiqi, 1980
