= Pythium rostratum =

Scientific classification
- Domain: Eukaryota
- Supergroup: Stramenopiles
- Division: Oomycota
- Class: Peronosporomycetes
- Order: Peronosporales
- Family: Pythiaceae
- Genus: Pythium
- Species: P. rostratum

Binomial name
- Pythium rostratum E.J. Butler, (1907)

Synonyms
- Globisporangium rostratum (E. J. Butler) Uzuhashi, Tojo, Kakishima, (2010); Pythium diameson Sideris

Species of single-celled organism

Pythium rostratum is a plant pathogen, specifically a fungus, that infects strawberries, fuchsias, and citruses.

P. rostratum is distributed throughout much of New Zealand, including Auckland, Waikato, Taranaki, Taupo, Wanganui, Wellington, Hawkes Bay, Wairarapa, South Canterbury, and Dunedin.
