= Phytophthora hibernalis =

Scientific classification
- Domain: Eukaryota
- Clade: Sar
- Clade: Stramenopiles
- Phylum: Oomycota
- Class: Peronosporomycetes
- Order: Peronosporales
- Family: Peronosporaceae
- Genus: Phytophthora
- Species: P. hibernalis

Binomial name
- Phytophthora hibernalis Carne, (1925)

Species of single-celled organism

Phytophthora hibernalis is a plant pathogen infecting citruses.
