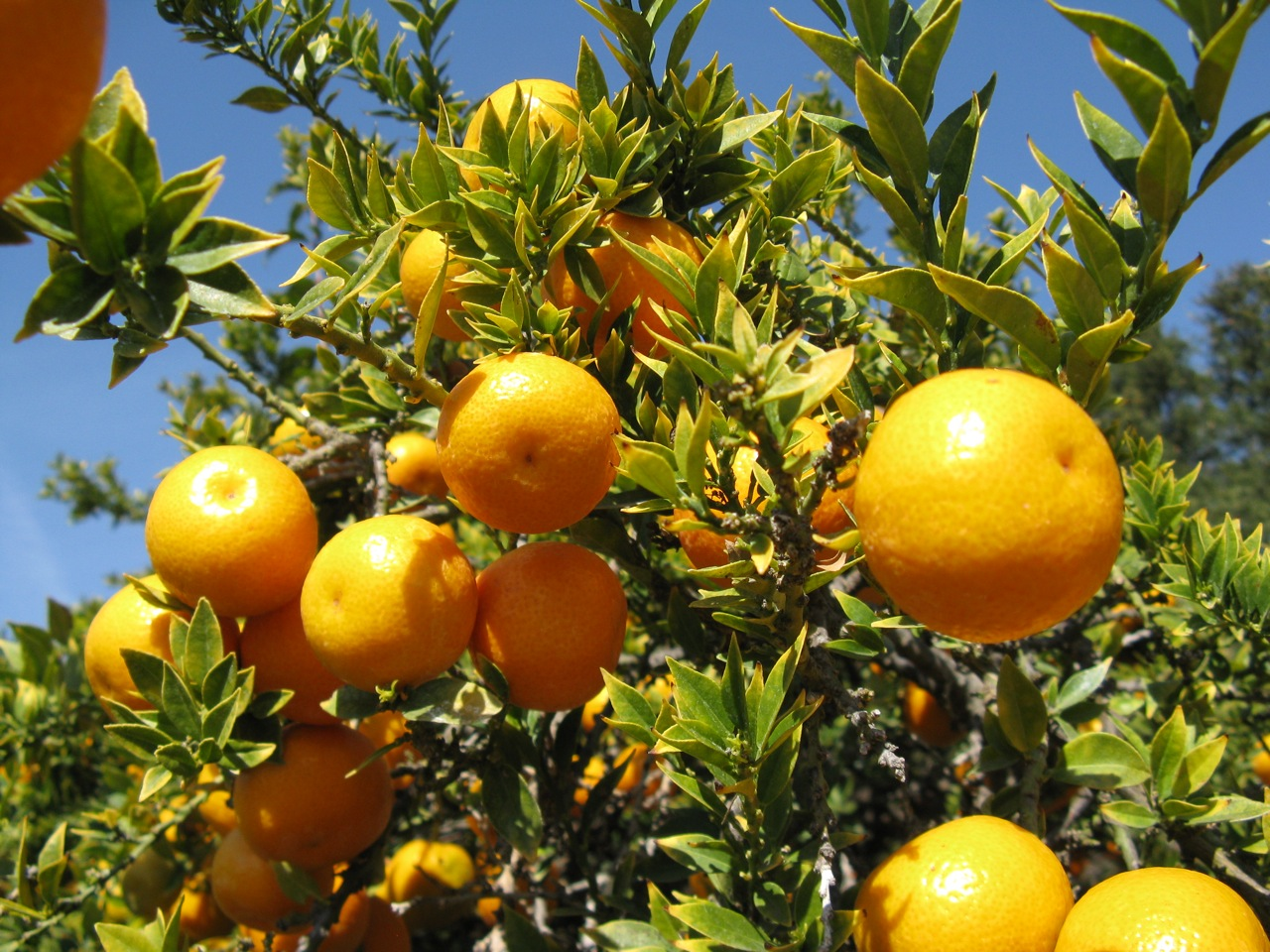
- Chinotto oranges growing on a tree

Scientific classification
- Kingdom: Plantae
- Clade: Tracheophytes
- Clade: Angiosperms
- Clade: Eudicots
- Clade: Rosids
- Order: Sapindales
- Family: Rutaceae
- Genus: Citrus
- Species: C. myrtifolia

Binomial name
- Citrus myrtifolia Raf.

= Citrus myrtifolia =

Myrtle-leaved orange tree

Species of tree

Citrus myrtifolia (chinotto), the myrtle-leaved orange tree, is a species of Citrus with foliage similar to that of the common myrtle. It is a compact tree with small leaves and no thorns which grows to a height of three metres (10 ft) and can be found in Malta, Libya, the south of France, and Italy (primarily in Liguria, typically Savona, and also in Tuscany, Sicily, and Calabria).

The fruit of the tree resembles small oranges. It has a bitter flavor and is commonly called by its Italian name, chinotto (Italian pronunciation: [kiˈnɔtto]). It is an essential flavoring agent of most Italian amari, of the popular Campari apéritif, and of several brands of carbonated soft drinks that are generically called "chinotto".

Citrus myrtifolia is sometimes planted in gardens. Due to its compactness, it can also be planted in a pot or other container.

== Usage ==
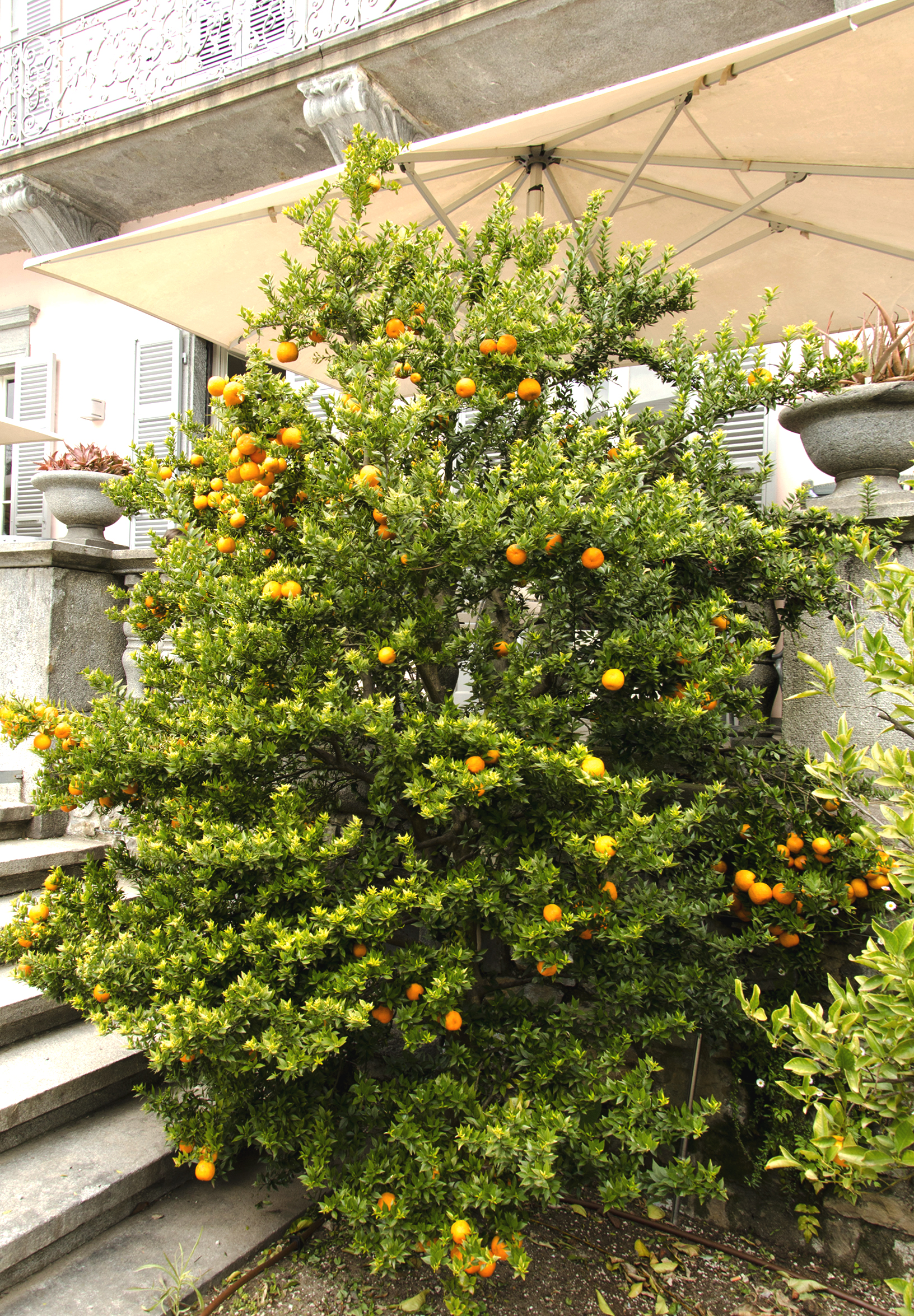
Chinotto at the Botanical Garden of the Brissago Islands

The plant produces small bitter fruits which can be used to make jams, candied fruits, and syrups. Such processing reduces the bitter taste. Chinotto juice can be used to produce a drink, and is a component of some digestifs.

== Synonyms ==
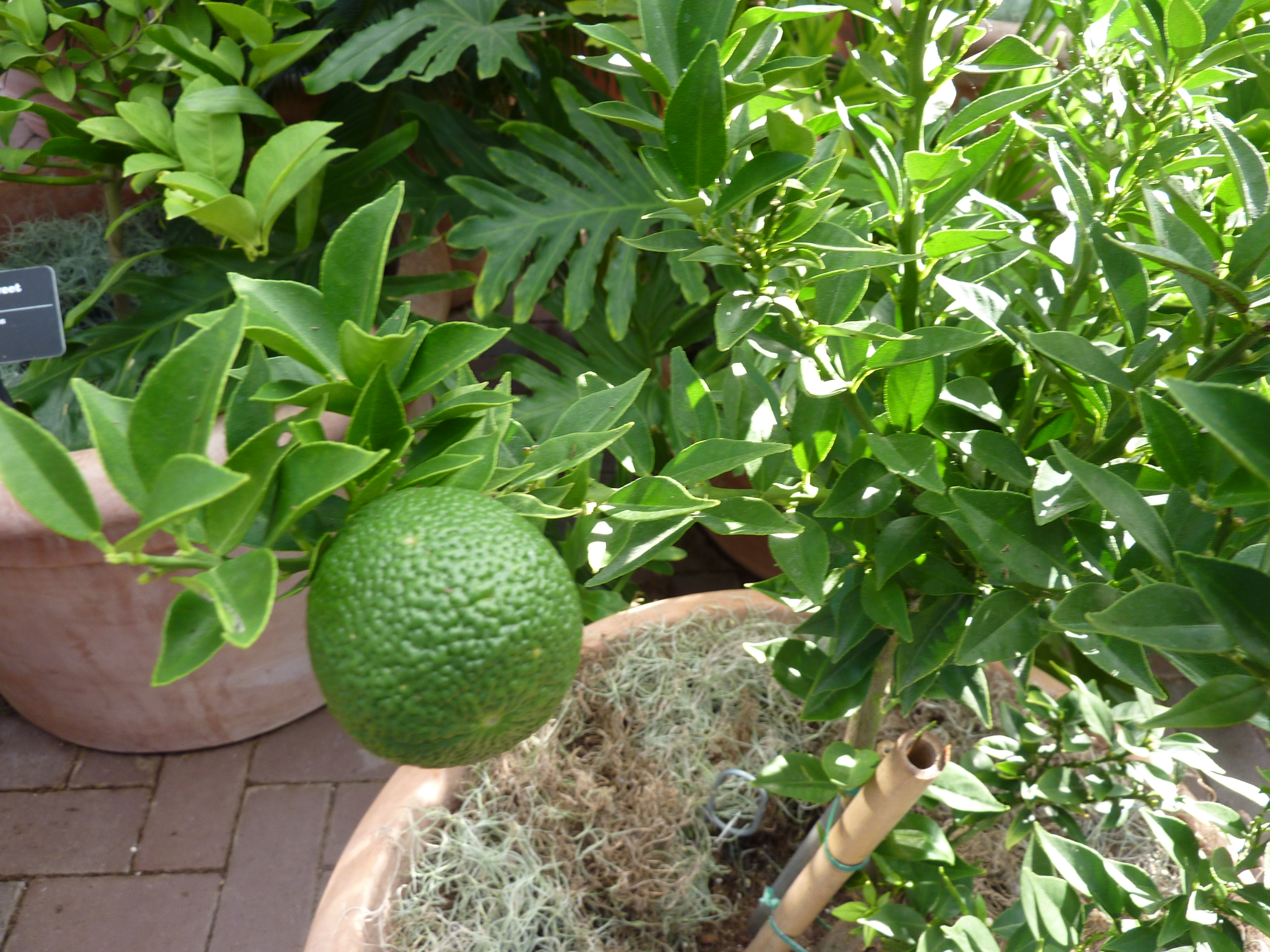
Chinotto a sour myrtifolia orange, at the Linnean House of the Missouri Botanical Garden

- Citrus aurantium var. myrtifolia Ker-Gawl. in Bot. Reg. vol. 4, t. 346, in textu. 1818.
- Citrus pumila Marc. in Izv. Sochin. Obl. Sukhum. Stants. vol. 2. 1921.
