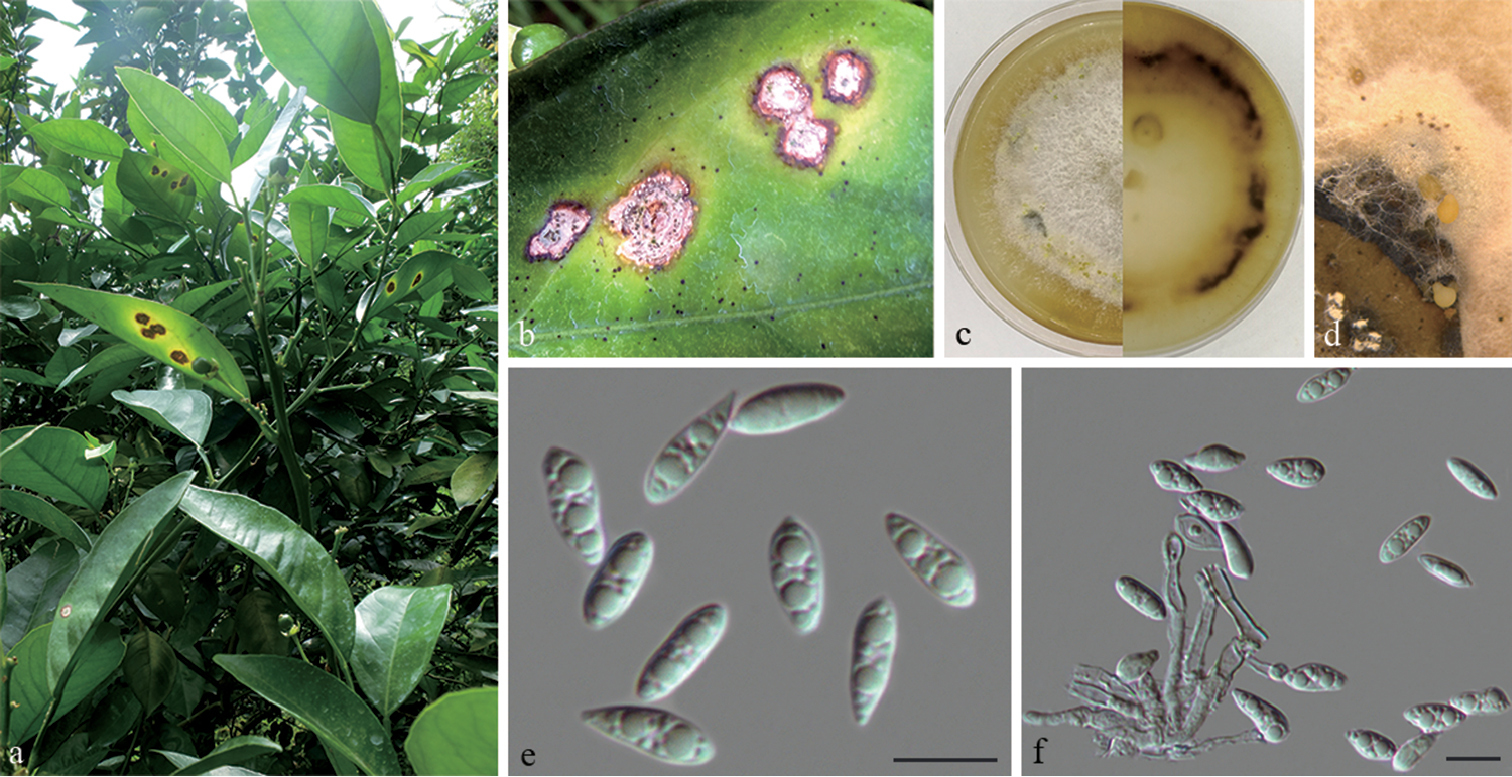

Scientific classification
- Kingdom: Fungi
- Division: Ascomycota
- Class: Sordariomycetes
- Order: Diaporthales
- Family: Diaporthaceae
- Genus: Diaporthe
- Species: D. citri

Binomial name
- Diaporthe citri F.A. Wolf

Synonyms
- Phomopsis californica H.S. Fawc., (1922); Phomopsis caribaea Home, (1922); Phomopsis citri H.S. Fawc. (1912); Phomopsis cytosporella Penz. & Sacc., (1887)

= Diaporthe citri =

Species of fungus

Diaporthe citri is a plant pathogen infecting citruses.
