= Citrus variegation virus =

Virus classification
- (unranked): Virus
- Realm: Riboviria
- Kingdom: Orthornavirae
- Phylum: Kitrinoviricota
- Class: Alsuviricetes
- Order: Martellivirales
- Family: Bromoviridae
- Genus: Ilarvirus
- Species: Ilarvirus CVV

Synonyms
- Citrus psorosis virus complex

Species of virus

Citrus variegation virus (CVV) is a plant pathogenic virus in the family Bromoviridae.
