= Outline of Saskatchewan =

Overview of and topical guide to Saskatchewan

Flag of Saskatchewan

Coat of arms of Saskatchewan

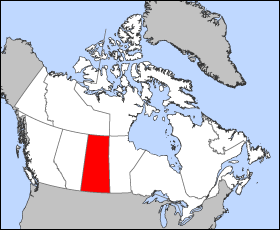
The location of the Province of Saskatchewan in Canada

The following outline is provided as an overview of and topical guide to Saskatchewan:

Saskatchewan – central prairie province in Canada, with an area of 588,276 square kilometres (227,100 sq mi), bounded on the west by Alberta, on the north by the Northwest Territories, on the east by Manitoba, and on the south by the U.S. states of Montana and North Dakota. Saskatchewan was first explored by Europeans in 1690 and settled in 1774; prior to that, it was populated by several indigenous tribes. It became a province in 1905. Saskatchewan's major industries are agriculture, mining, and energy. The province's name is derived from the Saskatchewan River. The river is designated kisiskāciwani-sīpiy ("swift flowing river") in the Cree language.

== General reference ==
- Pronunciation: /səˈskætʃɪwɑːn/
- Common English name(s): Saskatchewan or "SK" or "Sask"
- Official English name: Saskatchewan
- Common endonym(s): "Land of Living Skies"
- Official endonym(s): Province of Saskatchewan
- Adjectival(s): Saskatchewan
- Demonym(s): Saskatchewan
- Etymology: The province's name is derived from the Saskatchewan River. Earlier, the river was designated kisiskāciwani-sīpiy ("swift flowing river") in the Cree language.

== Geography of Saskatchewan ==
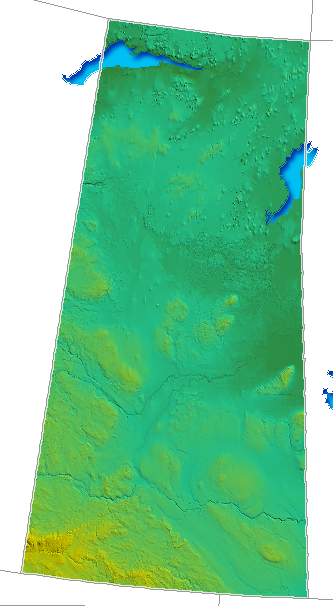
An enlargeable topographic relief map of the Province of Saskatchewan

Geography of Saskatchewan

- Saskatchewan is: a province of Canada
- Canada is: a country
- Location:
  - Northern Hemisphere, Western Hemisphere
    - Americas
      - North America
        - Northern America
          - Canada
  - Extreme points of Saskatchewan
- Population of Saskatchewan: 1,003,299 (est.)
- Area of Saskatchewan: 651,900 square kilometres (251,700.0 sq mi)
- Statistics of Saskatchewan
- Symbols of Saskatchewan
- Atlas of Saskatchewan
- Territorial evolution of Canada
- Time zones (Time in Saskatchewan): Central Time Zone: CST (UTC−06) or CDT (UTC−05)

=== Environment of Saskatchewan ===
- Climate of Saskatchewan
- Geology of Saskatchewan
- Wildlife of Saskatchewan
  - Flora of Saskatchewan
  - Fauna of Saskatchewan
    - Mammals of Saskatchewan
- Protected areas of Saskatchewan

==== Natural geographic features of Saskatchewan ====
- Lakes of Saskatchewan
- Rivers of Saskatchewan
- World Heritage Sites in Saskatchewan

=== Regions of Saskatchewan ===
Regions of Saskatchewan

==== Administrative divisions of Saskatchewan ====
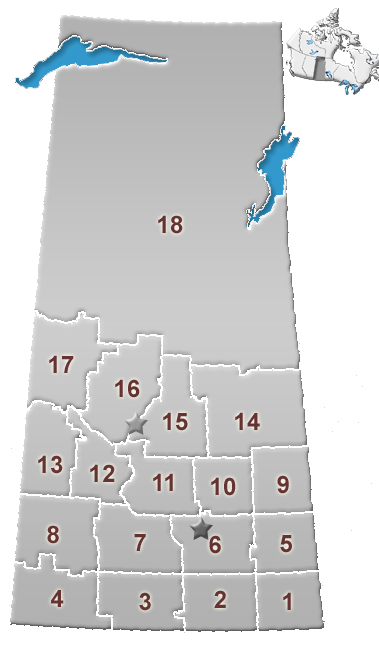
An enlargeable map of the census divisions of the Province of Saskatchewan

- Census divisions of Saskatchewan
- SARM divisions
- School districts in Saskatchewan

===== Municipalities of Saskatchewan =====
List of communities in Saskatchewan

- Rural municipalities
- Cities in Saskatchewan
- Towns in Saskatchewan
- Villages in Saskatchewan
- Hamlets in Saskatchewan
- Ghost towns in Saskatchewan
- Indian reserves in Saskatchewan

=== Demography of Saskatchewan ===
Demographics of Saskatchewan

== Government and politics of Saskatchewan ==
Politics of Saskatchewan

- Form of government: Constitutional monarchy
- Capital of Saskatchewan: Regina
- Elections in Saskatchewan
- First Nations in Saskatchewan
- Political parties in Saskatchewan
- Political scandals of Saskatchewan
- List of leaders of the opposition in Saskatchewan

=== Representation in the government of Canada ===
members of the Upper House are called Senators

- Saskatchewan senators

Members of the lower house are referred to as Members of Parliament MP

- Canadian federal electoral districts in Saskatchewan
- Historical federal electoral districts of Canada

=== Branches of the government of Saskatchewan ===
Government of Saskatchewan

==== Executive branch ====
- Head of state: Lieutenant-Governor of Saskatchewan - List of Saskatchewan lieutenant-governors (Monarchy in Saskatchewan)
  - Head of government: Premier of Saskatchewan, List of premiers of Saskatchewan
    - Cabinet of Saskatchewan

==== Legislative branch ====
- Parliament: Legislature of Saskatchewan (unicameral)

Members of the Legislative Assembly (MLA)

- List of Saskatchewan political parties
- List of Saskatchewan provincial electoral districts

==== Judicial branch ====
- Court of Appeal for Saskatchewan
  - Court of King's Bench for Saskatchewan
    - Provincial Court of Saskatchewan
- History of Saskatchewan Courts

=== Interprovincial relations ===
==== Interprovincial organization membership ====
Saskatchewan is a member of:

- Trade, Investment and Labour Mobility Agreement (TILMA)

=== Law of Saskatchewan ===
- The Saskatchewan Act
  - LGBT rights in Saskatchewan
    - Same-sex marriage in Saskatchewan
- Law enforcement in Saskatchewan
  - Royal Canadian Mounted Police

== History of Saskatchewan ==
History of Saskatchewan

=== By period ===
- Rupert's Land 1670 to 1870
- Territorial evolution of Canada 1870-1905
  - District of Assiniboia 1882-1905
  - District of Saskatchewan 1882-1905
  - District of Athabasca 1882-1905
- North-West Rebellion 1885
  - Provisional Government of Saskatchewan

=== By subject ===
- History of courts in Saskatchewan
- Ghost towns in Saskatchewan

== Culture of Saskatchewan ==
Culture of Saskatchewan

- Cuisine of Saskatchewan
  - Canadian Chinese cuisine
- Provincial symbols of Saskatchewan
  - Coat of arms of Saskatchewan
  - Flag of Saskatchewan
- World Heritage Sites in Saskatchewan

=== The Arts in Saskatchewan ===
- Music of Saskatchewan

=== Sports in Saskatchewan ===
Sport in Saskatchewan

- Cricket in Saskatchewan
- Curling in Saskatchewan
- Hockey in Saskatchewan
- Football in Saskatchewan
  - Canadian Football League
    - Saskatchewan Roughriders
- Rugby in Saskatchewan
- Skiing in Saskatchewan
- Soccer in Saskatchewan

== Economy and infrastructure of Saskatchewan ==
Economy of Saskatchewan

- Agriculture in Saskatchewan
- Coal mining in Saskatchewan
- Health care in Saskatchewan
- List of tallest structures in Saskatchewan
- Tourism in Saskatchewan
- Transportation in Saskatchewan
  - Airports in Saskatchewan
  - Roads in Saskatchewan
    - Highways
  - Railways

== Education in Saskatchewan ==
Education in Saskatchewan

- List of Saskatchewan school divisions
- Higher education in Saskatchewan
  - Colleges in Saskatchewan
  - Universities in Saskatchewan
    - University of Regina
    - University of Saskatchewan
      - University of Saskatchewan academics
      - Alumni-related
        - List of University of Saskatchewan alumni

== See also ==
- Outline of geography
  - Outline of Canada
    - Outline of Alberta
    - Outline of British Columbia
    - Outline of Manitoba
    - Outline of Nova Scotia
    - Outline of Ontario
    - Outline of Prince Edward Island
    - Outline of Quebec
- Index of Saskatchewan-related articles (alphabetical index)
