= Fauna of Saskatchewan =

Native animals of Saskatchewan

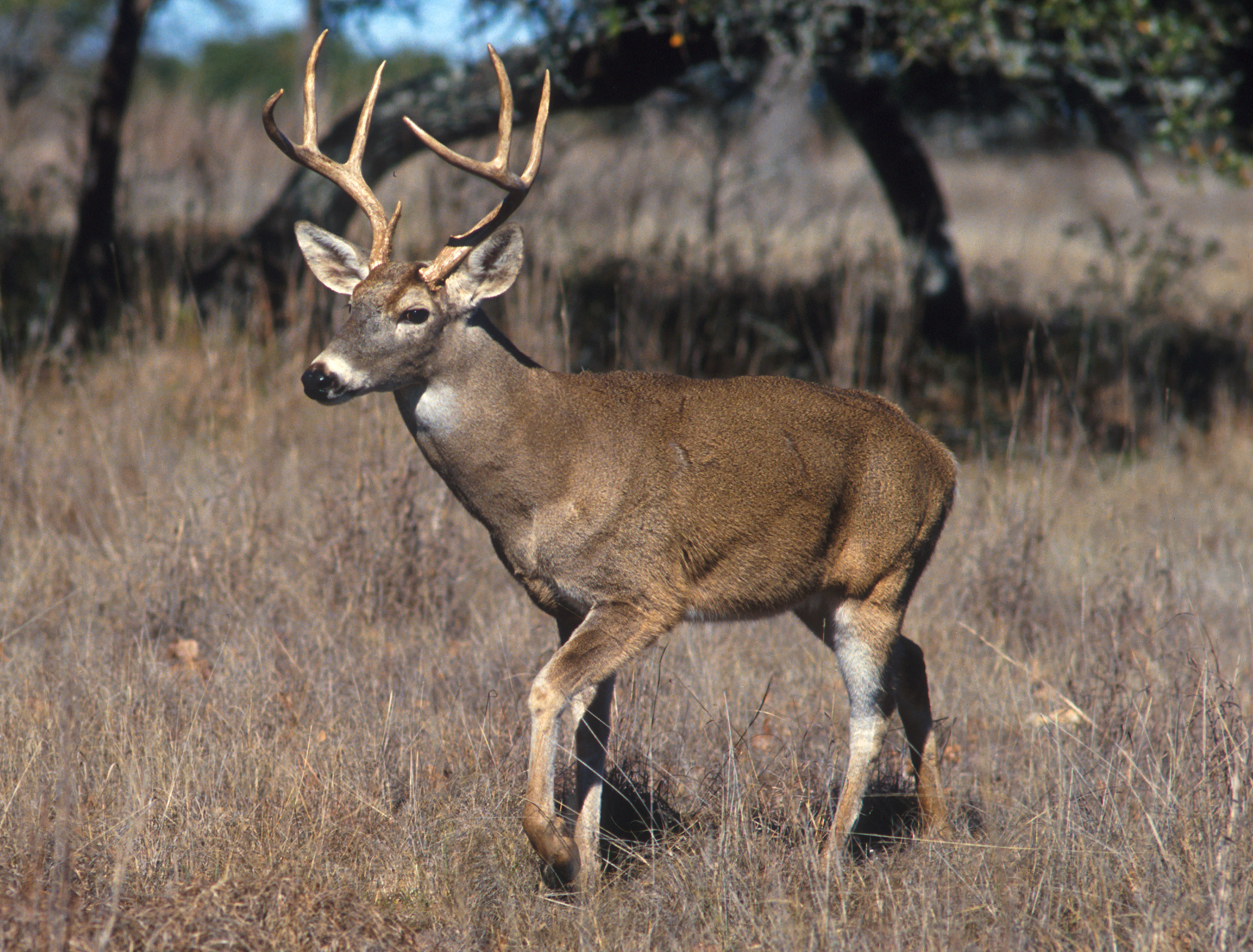
Mammal: white-tailed deer

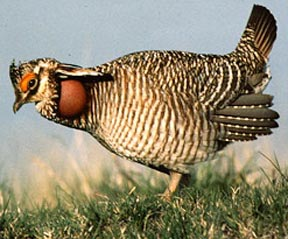
Bird: sharp-tailed grouse

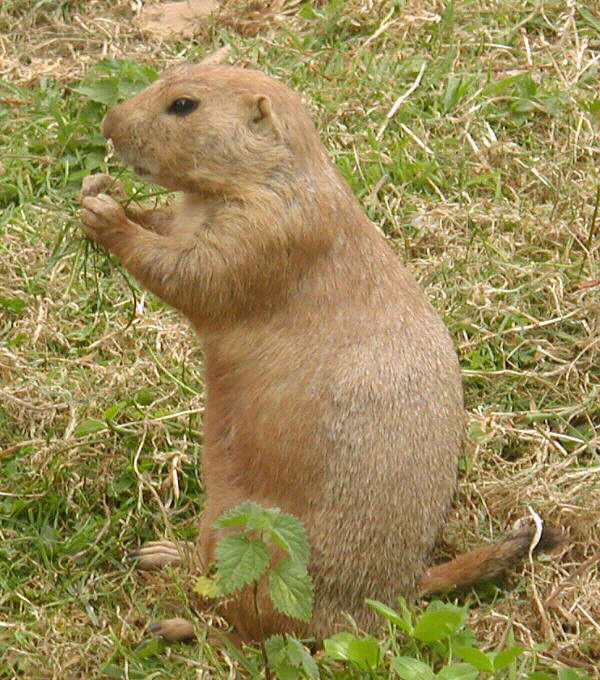
Prairie dog

The Fauna of Saskatchewan include several diverse land and aquatic animal species. From the multiplicity of invertebrates and vertebrates, two have been chosen as symbols of Saskatchewan. Cenozoic vertebrate fossils reveal the geological evolution of the interior plains and its prehistoric biogeography. Today, Saskatchewan's ecosystems range from the sub-arctic tundra of the Canadian Shield in north Saskatchewan to aspen parkland, the Mid-Continental Canadian forests in the centre of the province and grassland prairie. Fauna inhabit areas unique to their own specific and varied breeding, foraging and nesting requirements. With a large land and water area, and small population density, the ecoregions of Saskatchewan provide important habitat for many animals, both endangered and not. Naturalists observing wildlife have enumerated shrinking and growing wildlife populations. They advocate programs and methods to preserve or re-introduce endangered species and identify programs of control for outbreaks of wildlife populations. A broad diversity of wildlife habitats are preserved as parks and reserves protecting the feeding and breeding grounds of protected and indigenous fauna of Saskatchewan.

== Provincial symbols ==
The sharp-tailed grouse (Pedioectes phasianellus jamesi) was declared the symbol of Saskatchewan in 1945. As of 2001, the provincial animal is the white-tailed deer (Odocoileus virginianus).

== Ancient fauna - paleontology ==
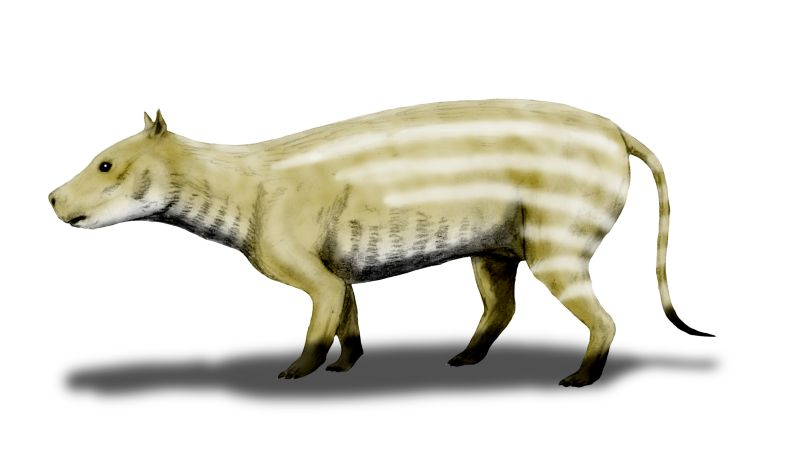
Mercycoidodon culbertsoni prehistoric camel type mammal

Fossils have been uncovered which have dated back to the Paleocene, Eocene, Oligocene, Miocene, and Pleistocene periods. These Cenozoic vertebrates include mammals, amphibians and reptiles. There have been fossils of birds unearthed as well which have dated back (55.8±0.2 to 33.9±0.1 Ma) to the Eocene and 23.03 to 5.33 Ma to the Miocene period. Historically mammoths and mastodons which migrated across the Bering land bridge from Eurasia roamed the plains. Black bear, Bison antiquus, Bison latifrons, bobcat, Bos bison, caribou, cheetah, Columbian mammoth, elk, grizzly bear, horse, ice age elephant, llama, lion, moose, one-hump camel, pronghorn, saber-toothed cat steppe bison (Bison priscus), white-tail and mule deer, woolly mammoth populated the plains in pre-historic eras. American bison, commonly known as "buffalo" is the largest and most notable mammal found in Saskatchewan dating back to its ancestors Bison antiquus, and Bison latifrons. Large reptiles such as mosasaurs, plesiosaurs, ichthyosaurs and sea turtles lived in the seas which covered Saskatchewan, Triceratops fossils were also unearthed. A scampering non-hopping rabbit Palaeolagus Temnodon and Megalagus were some of the Eocdene-Oligocene mammalian paleofauna uncovered at the Cypress Hills Formation of Saskatchewan. An abundance of Calf Creek Local Fauna has been unearthed at the Cypress Hills Formation. Eastend is about 16 kilometres (9.9 mi) southeast of this site. The following microvertebrates have been located Daphoenacyon dodges, Daphoenus, Daphoenine or bear dog; Parictis parvas, P. Nimravid or small bear; Hesperocyon gregarious or small fox-dog; Hemipsalodon grandis or subjective synonym of Pterodon, and Hyaenodon horridus H. microdon or carnivorous hyaena. Artiodactyls are even toed hoofed mammals such as deer, pigs, camels, goats and cattle. Among the 53 mammalian taxa of fossils from the Swift Current area are the Cypretherium coactatum or terminator pig; Ibarus storer, I. ignotus, or herbivorous fast running small deer the size of a rabbit; Merycoidodon culbertsoni Leidy or camel type mammal that lived in herds; Limnenetes anceps or a cud chewing plant eating sheep sized hippopotamus; Hendryomeryx esulcatus, Leptomeryx speciosus and L. mammifer or small hornless ruminant; Didelphodus serus or meat eating marsupial about the size of a Virginia opossum or house cat; Thylacaelurus campester; Wallia scalopidens is a fossilised proscalopid insectivore bat; Auxontodon processus; Microparamys solidus The Cretaceous–Paleogene boundary marks the Cretaceous–Paleogene extinction event which saw the extinction of many of these prehistoric animals which remain only as fossil remnants.

== Native species ==
=== Vertebrates ===
==== Mammals - Mammal fauna ====
Mammal species differ between the various ecoregions of Saskatchewan. Members of six orders of placental mammals which inhabit Saskatchewan. They are the bats, carnivores (including the pinnipeds), artiodactyls, cetaceans, insectivores, and rodents (including the lagomorphs).

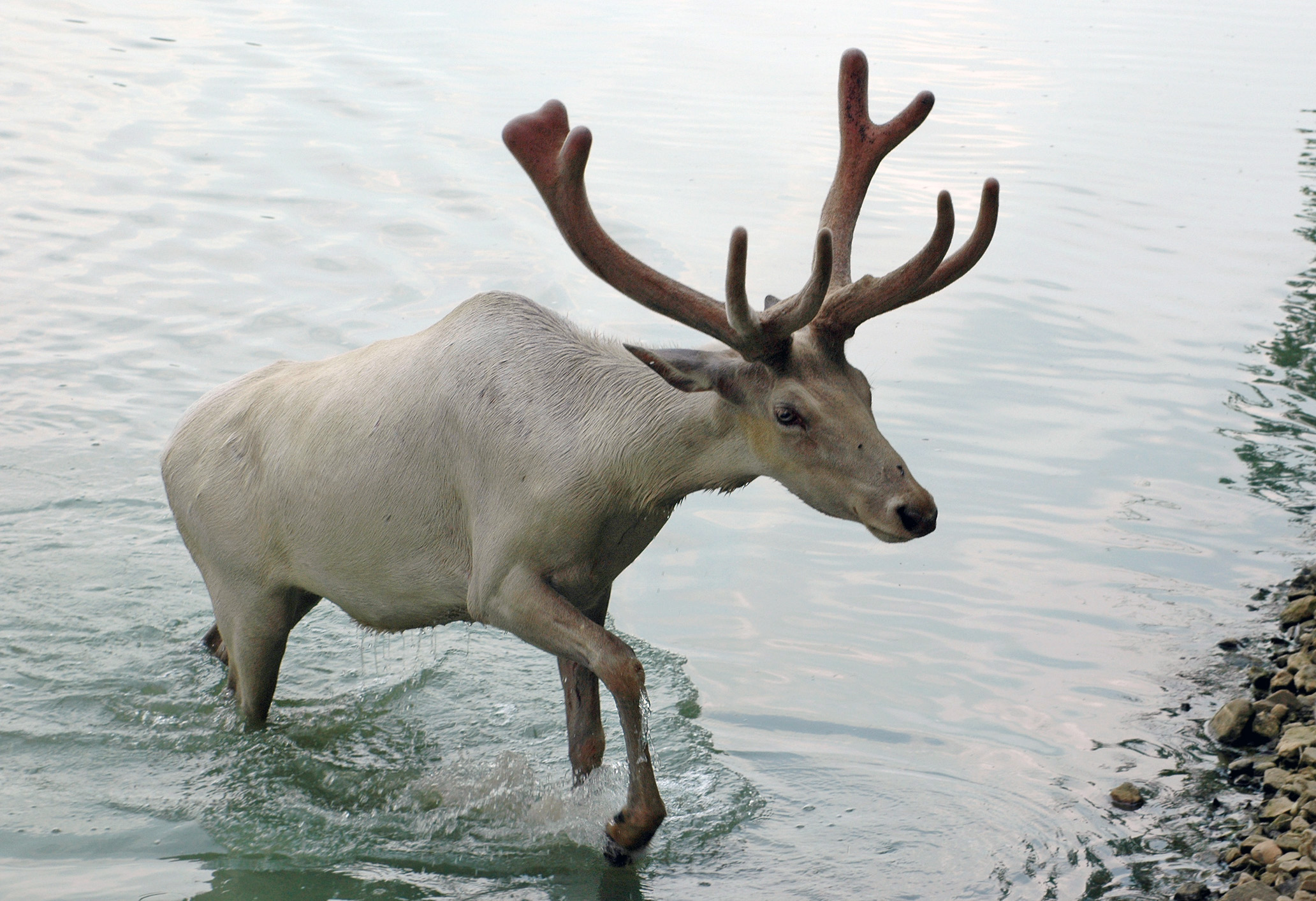
Barren-ground caribou (Rangifer tarandus groenlandicus)

There are fewer varieties of species as elevation increases which corresponds to the Taiga and Boreal Shield and Cypress Hills Uplands econzones. Mammals which endure the harsh environment in the far north Taiga shield, Boreal Shield and Boreal Plain ecozones are American black bear (Ursus americanus), barren-ground caribou (Rangifer tarandus groenlandicus), western moose (Alces alces anderson), hoary bat (Lasiurus cinereus), wolverine (Gulo gulo), American marten (Martes americana), timber wolf (Canis lupus occidentalis), red fox (Vulpes vulpes), mink (Neovison vison), snowshoe hare (Lepus americanus), and red-backed vole (Clethrionomys).

The Athabasca Plain ecoregion supplies lichen as winter forage for the woodland caribou. The Arctic fox as their predator is also found in this region. As well as the mammals of the Taiga Shield ecozone, little brown myotis (Myotis lucifugus), Canadian lynx (Lynx canadensis), timber wolf, Canadian beaver (Castor canadensis), muskrat (Ondatra zibethicus) are found in the Boreal Shield ecozone

The beavers dam small streams throughout Saskatchewan. The muskrat and beaver were exploited for their fur and beaver pelts. Beavers are still trapped for the fur trade industry and were almost extirpated in the first half of the 20th century. The Mid-Boreal Upland ecoregion within the Boreal Plains Ecozone features white-tailed deer (Odocoileus virginianus), mule deer (Odocoileus hemionus), big brown bat (Eptesicus fuscus), silver-haired bat (Lasionycteris noctivagans) and the other mammals of the northern boreal forests. There is a lower population of mammalian wildlife amidst the fens, marshes, bogs and swamps that demark the muskeg area of the Mid-Boreal Lowland. The large mammals of the northern Taiga Shield and Boreal ecozones can still be supported in this transitional area, however elk, reindeer, wolf are animals of the boreal forest.

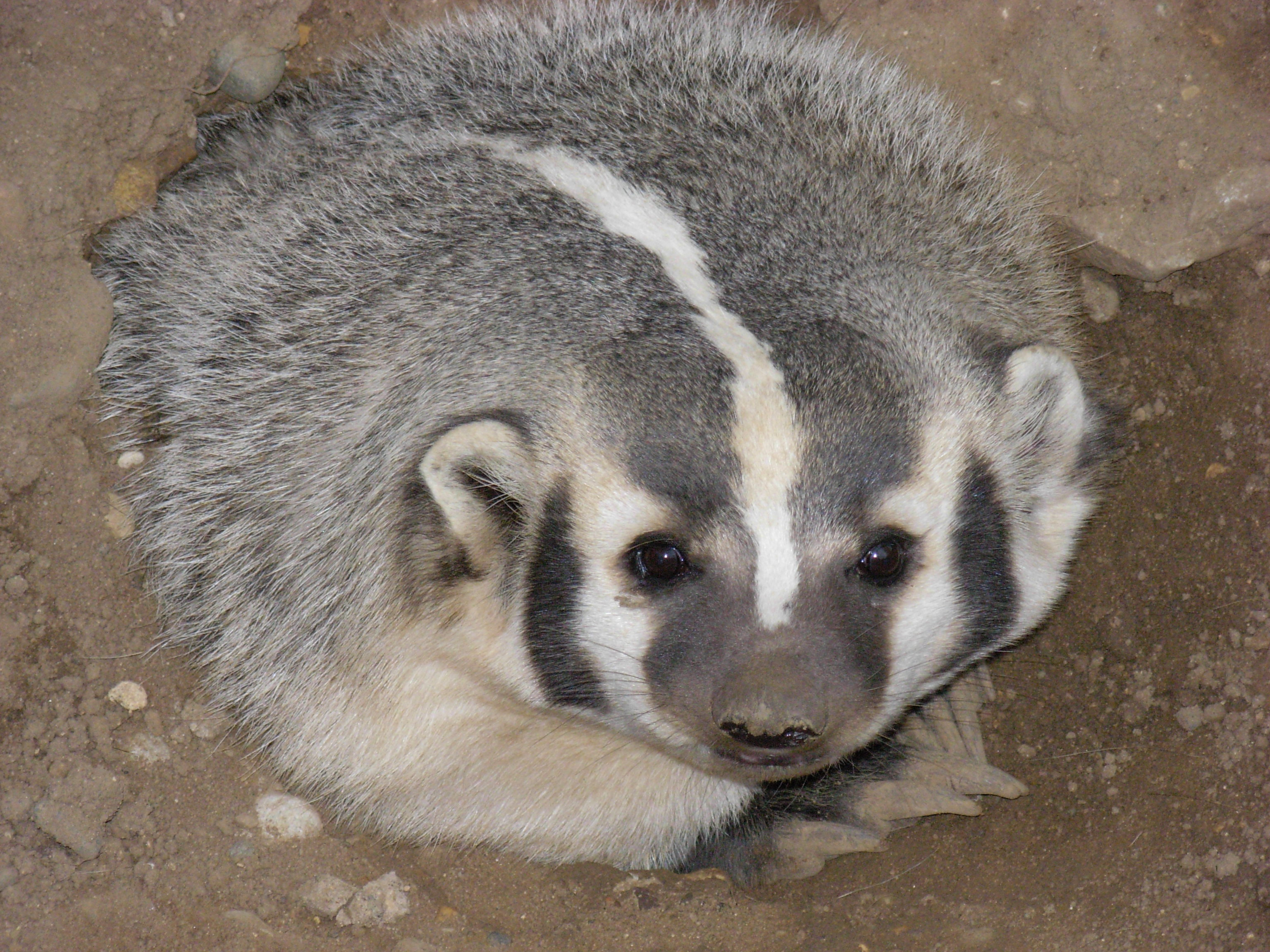
American badger (Taxidea taxus)

As well smaller mammals such as Keen's myotis (Myotis keenii), northern flying squirrel (Glaucomys sabrinus), fisher (Martes pennanti), ermine (Mustela erminea), North American river otter (Lontra canadensis), least chipmunk (Tamius minimus) and short-tailed shrew (Blarina brevicauda) are sighted along with snowshoe hares, and white-tailed deer in the Boreal Transition ecoregion. Carnivores which prey on these creatures such as lynx and wolves are also located in the area.

The Aspen Parkland is agricultural land. The most prominent wildlife species which may be found are coyote (Canis latrans), hare, striped skunk (Mephitis mephitis), North American porcupine (Erethizon dorsatum), Richardson's ground squirrel (Spermophilus richardsonii), snowshoe hare, cottontail (Sylvilagus floridanus), northern pocket gopher (Thomomys talpoides), Franklin's ground squirrel (Spermophilus franklinii) and red fox. The Aspen Parkland is the environment of choice for the white-tailed deer.

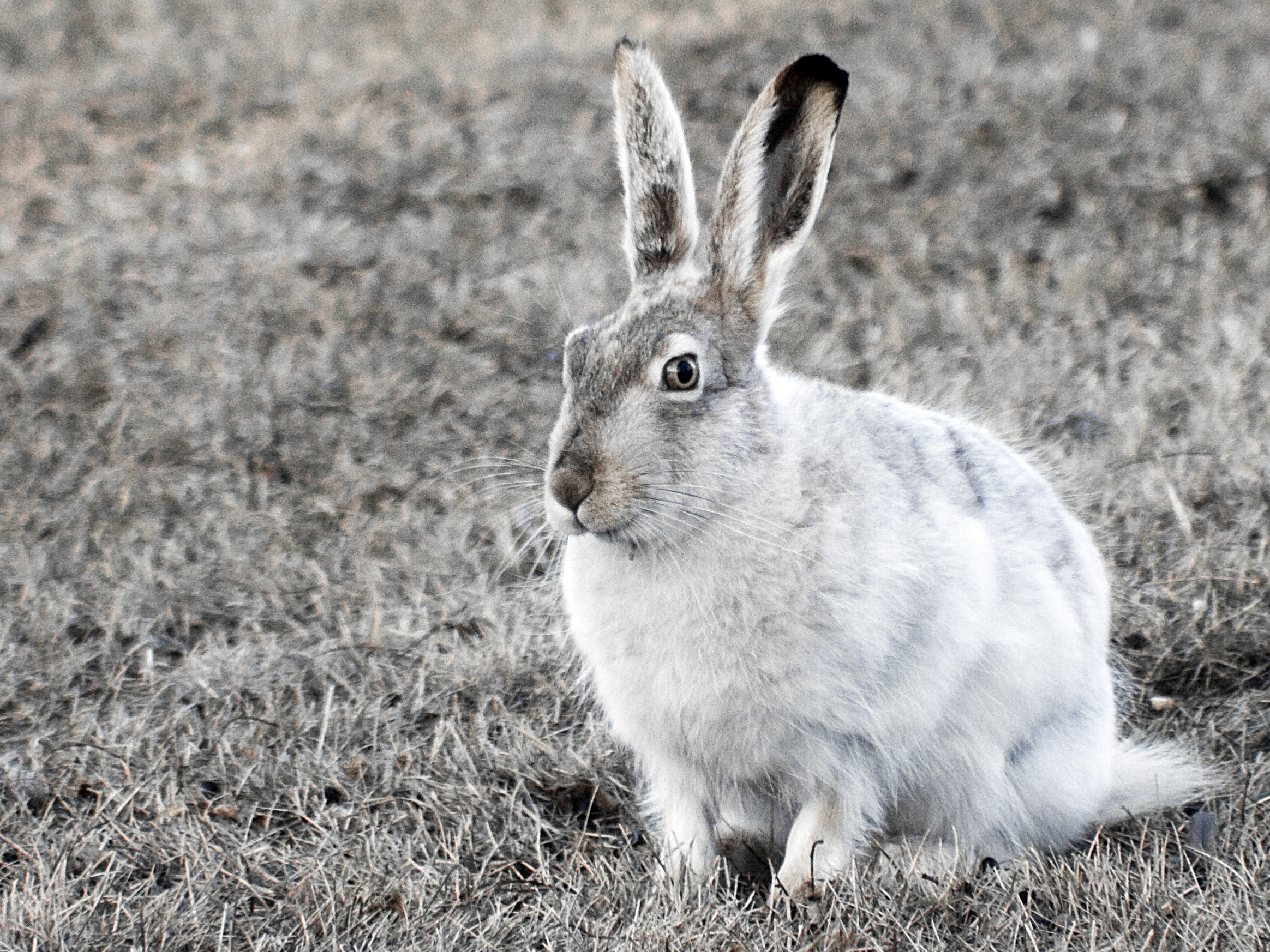
Jackrabbit

The Moist Mixed Grassland ecoregion is characterized by white-tailed deer, pronghorn (Antilocapra americana), coyote, rabbit, American badger (Taxidea taxus), red bat (Lasiurus borealis) and ground squirrel such as black-tailed prairie dog (Cynomys ludovicianus). Animal populations of the Mixed Grassland enumerate pronghorn, white-tailed and mule deer, long-eared myotis (Myotis evotis), small-footed myotis (Myotis subulatus), jack rabbit, coyote, Richardson's ground squirrel. The only Canadian site of black-tailed prairie dog is in the Mixed Grassland prairie ecoregion. The raised elevation of the Cypress Upland results in white spruce and aspen forests and an ecoregion more resembling the boreal forested areas than the prairielands. Moose, pronghorn, mule and white-tailed deer, elk, rabbit, and ground squirrel coyote are common in this ecoregion.

==== Birds - avifauna ====
As of 2017, there were 436 species of birds that have been observed in Saskatchewan. The most unique birds to Saskatchewan are the Whooping crane, Baird's sparrow, Lark bunting, Greater sage-grouse, Sprague's pipit, and the Burrowing owl - each of which are more than 20 times more likely to be seen in the province than the rest of Canada.

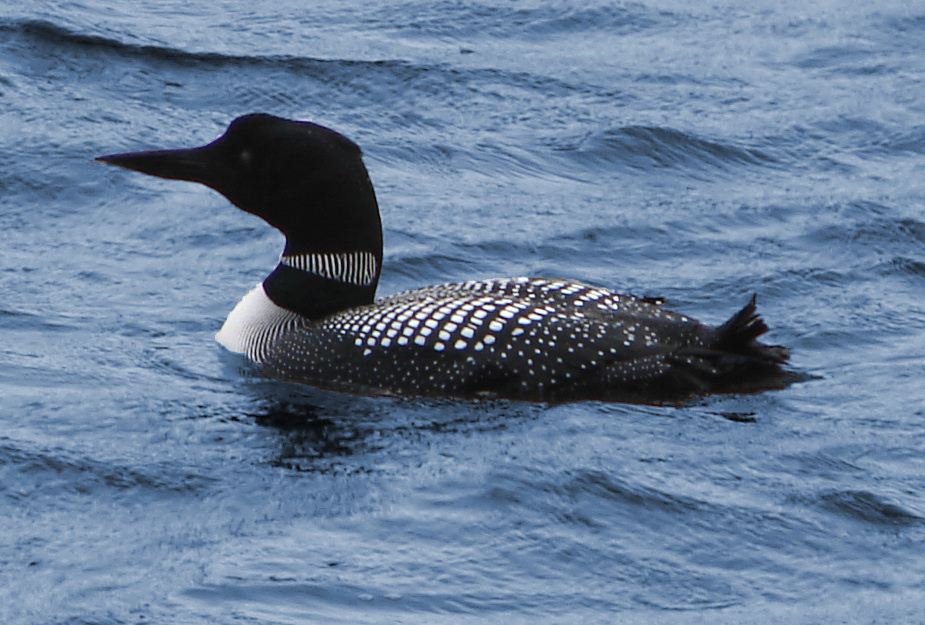
Common loon

Owls, grouse, and finches overwinter in the province. Bird species which can be found in the northern Taiga Shield ecozone, Selwyn Lake Upland ecoregion, include Harris's sparrow (Zonotrichia querula,), pine grosbeak (Pinicola enucleator), grey-cheeked thrush (Catharus minimus), tree sparrow (Passer montanus), spruce grouse (Dendragapus canadensis), willow ptarmigan (Lagopus lagopus), sandhill crane (Grus canadensis), waterfowl and shorebirds. As a part of the Tazin Lake Upland, prominent birds are common loon, greater yellowlegs (Tringa melanoleuca), white-crowned sparrow (Zonotrichia leucophrys) and golden eagle (Aquila chrysaetos). The Athabasca Plain ecoregion in the Boreal Shield provides breeding grounds for the Bohemian waxwing (Bombycilla garrulus), white-winged crossbill (Loxia leucoptera), Cape May warbler (Dendroica tigrina), Canada goose (Branta canadensis) and blackpoll warbler (Dendroica striata). In the south west area of the Boreal Shield ecozone lays the Churchill River Upland which has the second highest population of bald eagles (Haliaeetus leucocephalus).

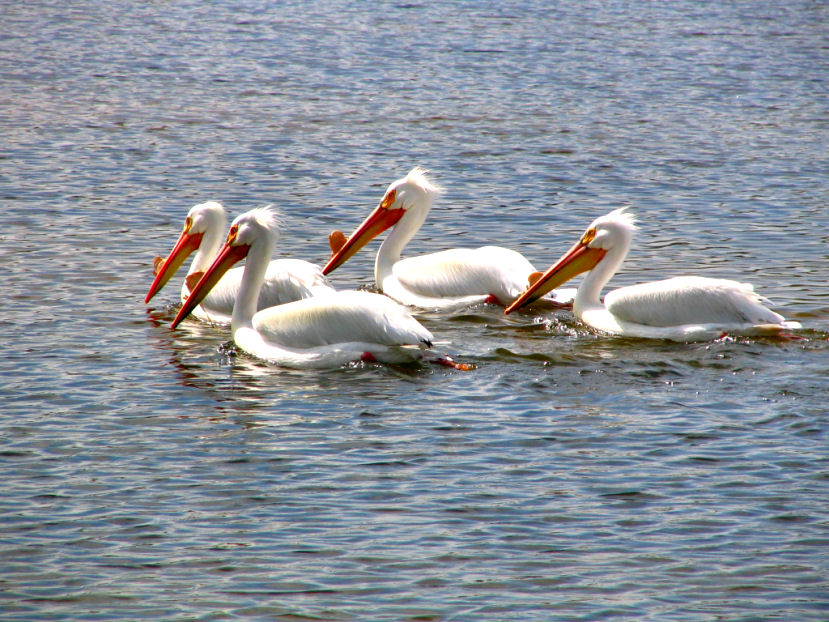
American white pelican (Pelecanus erythrorhynchos) Its arrival is a sign of spring arriving.

This Upland area is home to waterfowl, such as the common loon (Gavia immer), red-breasted merganser (Mergus serrator), as well as other ducks, and geese on the many lakes of the region. The raven (Corvus corax), spruce grouse, Canada jay (Perisoreus canadensis), Connecticut warbler (Oporornis agilis), American three-toed woodpecker (Picoides dorsalis), osprey (Pandion haliaetus) and hawk owl (Surnia ulula) can be sighted in the boreal forests. The Mid-Boreal Upland ecoregion features these characteristic birds: white-throated sparrow (Zonotrichia albicollis), red-tailed hawk (Buteo jamaicensis), American redstart (Setophaga ruticilla), bufflehead (Bucephala albeola), Ovenbird (Seiurus aurocapillus) and hermit thrush (Catharus guttatus). The ruffed grouse (Bonasa umbellus), Canada warbler (Wilsonia canadensis), ruby-crowned kinglet (Regulus calendula) and white-breasted nuthatch (Sitta carolinensis), American white pelican (Pelecanus erythrorhynchos) are common sightings in the Mid-Boreal Lowland ecoregion.

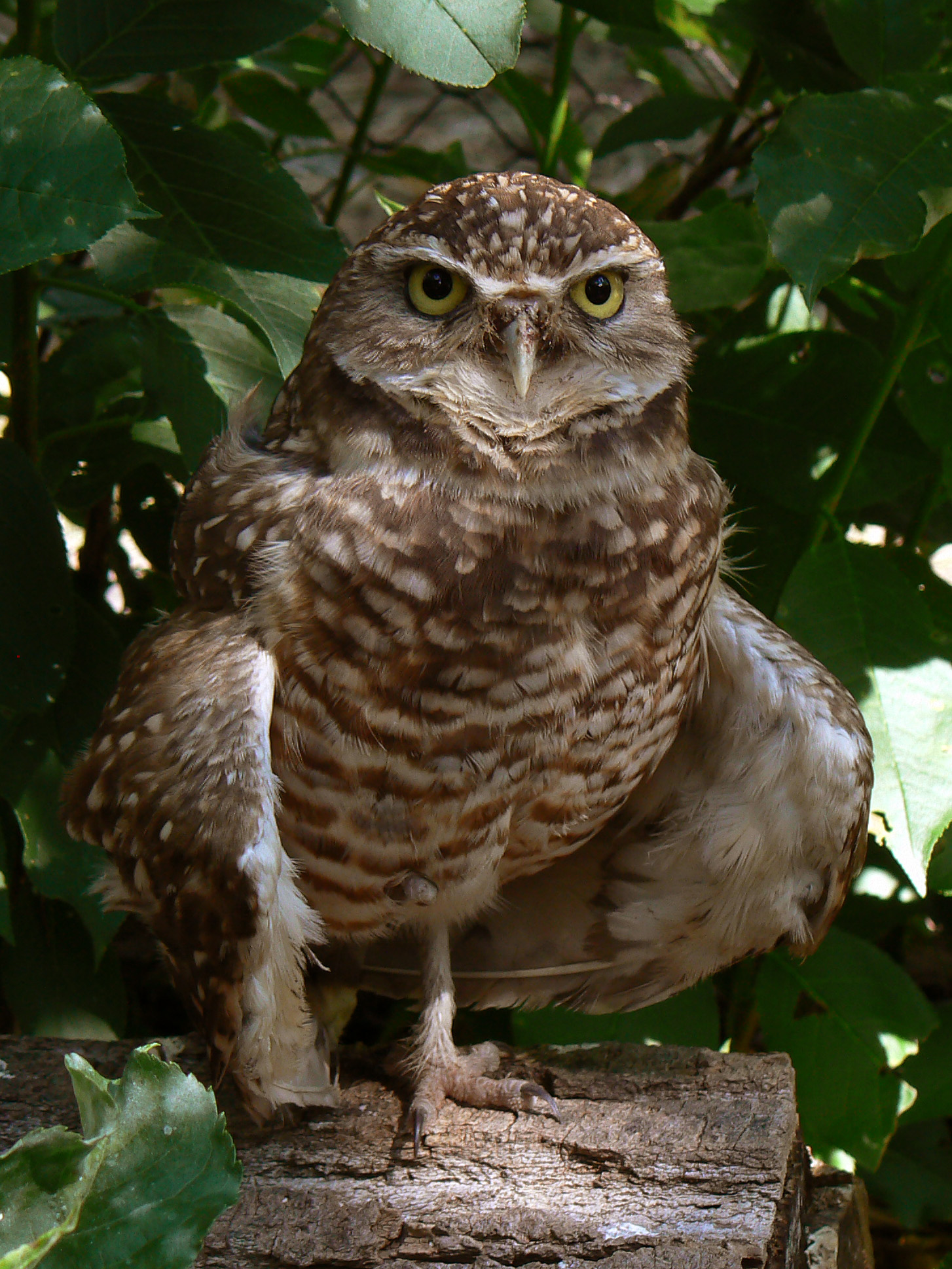
Burrowing owl (Athene cunicularia)

Diverse bird species populate the Boreal Transition ecoregion such as black and white warbler (Mniotilta varia), boreal chickadee (Poecile hudsonicus), great-crested fly-catcher (Myiarchus crinitus) and neotropical migrant bird species. The predominant avifauna of the Aspen Parkland are house wren (Troglodytes aedon), least flycatcher ( Empidonax minimus), Northern yellow warbler (Dendroica petechia) and western kingbird (Tyrannus verticalis). Sharp-tailed grouse (Tympahuchus phasianellus), ruffed grouse (Bonasa umbellus), black-billed magpie (Pica pica), Double-crested cormorant, ring-billed gull (Larus delawarensis), glaucous-winged gull (Larus glaucescens) and neotropical migrant bird species. The Aspen Parkland with its many sloughs and saline lakes provides breeding grounds for ducks and other waterfowl, black tern (Chlidonias niger), Forster's tern (Sterna forsteri), American white pelican.

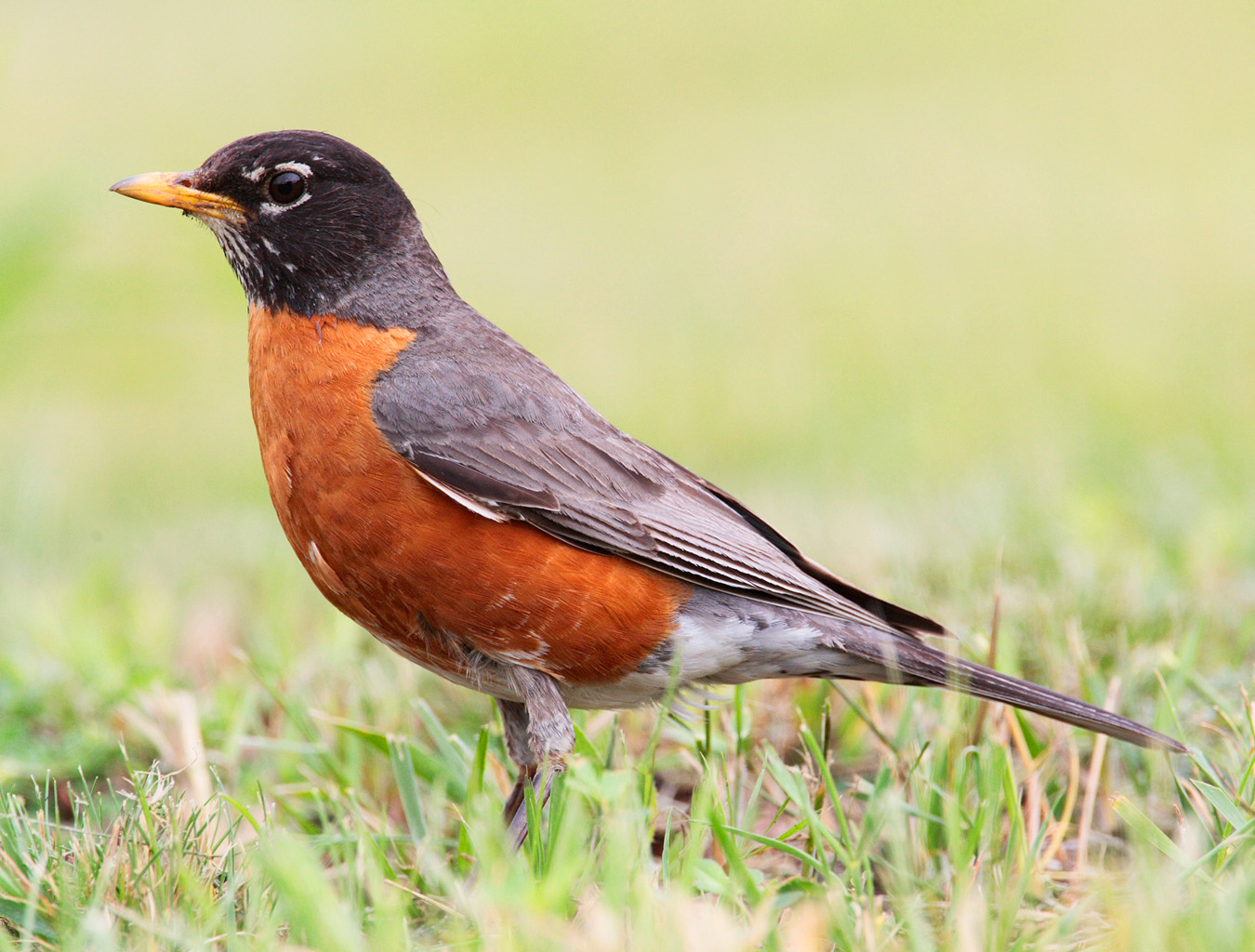
American robin, (Turdus migratorius) The arrival signals one of the first signs of spring.

Typical birds of the Moist Mixed Grassland ecoregion include waterfowl around ponds and sloughs and the western meadowlark (Sturnella neglecta), yellow-headed blackbird (Xanthocephalus xanthocephalus), piping plover (Charadrius melodus), sharp-tailed grouse, eastern kingbird (Tyrannus tyrannus), and Franklin's gull. The Mixed Grassland in southern Saskatchewan features these characteristic birds ferruginous hawk Buteo regalis, long-billed curlew (Numenius americanus), yellow-breasted chat (Icteria virens), chestnut-collared longspur (Calcarius ornatus), burrowing owl (Athene cunicularia) and sage grouse (Centrocercus urophasianus). Characteristic birds of the Cypress Upland ecoregion are trumpeter swan (Cygnus buccinator), sage grouse, golden eagle (Aquila chrysaetos), yellow-rumped warbler, MacGillivray's warbler (Oporornis tolmiei), dusky flycatcher (Empidonax oberholseri) and Townsend's solitaire (Myadestes townsendi). There is one species of avifauna found only in the Cypress Upland, Audubon's warbler (Dendroica coronata auduboni).

==== Amphibians and reptiles - herpetofauna ====
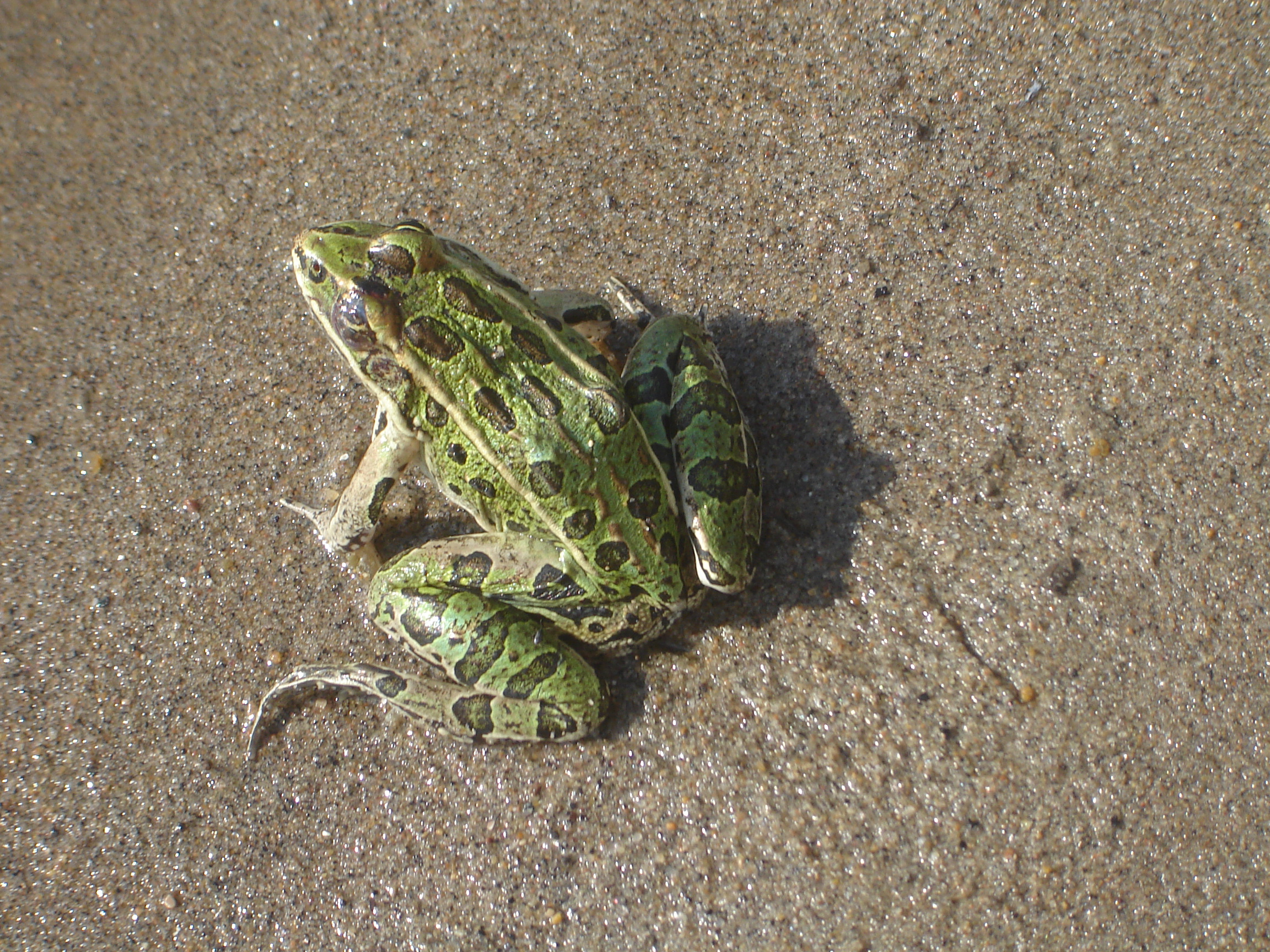
Leopard frog (Rana pipiens)

Typical reptiles in the Mixed Grassland ecoregion are the horned lizard (Phrynosoma), common garter snake (Thamnophis sirtalis), common snapping turtle (Chelydra serpentina), and prairie rattlesnake, and western painted turtle (C. p. bellii). The leopard frogs (Rana pipiens) and chorus frogs (Pseudacris) are typical amphibians of the Grasslands National Park.

==== Fish - ichyofauna ====
The lake trout (Salvelinus namaycush), Arctic grayling (Thymallus arcticus), white sucker (Catostomus commersoni), longnose sucker (Catostomus catostomus), burbot (Lota lota), lake herring (Coregonus artedi), lake whitefish, (Coregonus clupeaformis), walleye or pickerel (Sander vitreus), and northern pike (Esox lucius) are fish found in the freshwater lakes in Saskatchewan.Perch (Perca flavescens) swim alongside the northern pike, walleye, lake trout in the Mid-boreal lowland. The lake sturgeon (Acipenser fulvescens), goldeye (Hiodon alosoides), and bigmouth buffalo (Ictiobus cyprinellus) are fish species of the Saskatchewan River.

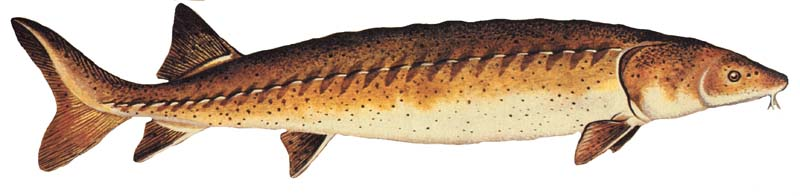
Lake sturgeon (Acipenser fulvescens)

Streams and ponds throughout the Saskatchewan prairies may be stocked with rainbow trout (Oncorhynchus mykiss), brook (Salvelinus fontinalis), and brown trout (Salmo trutta morpha fario and S. trutta morpha lacustris). Catfish (Sluriformes) and carp (Cyprinidae) range through the Frenchman river.

There are significant commercial fisheries for both freshwater and salt-water species. The Fort Qu'Appelle Fish Culture Station stocks lakes and streams in this way winter killed lakes are replenished.

=== Invertebrates ===
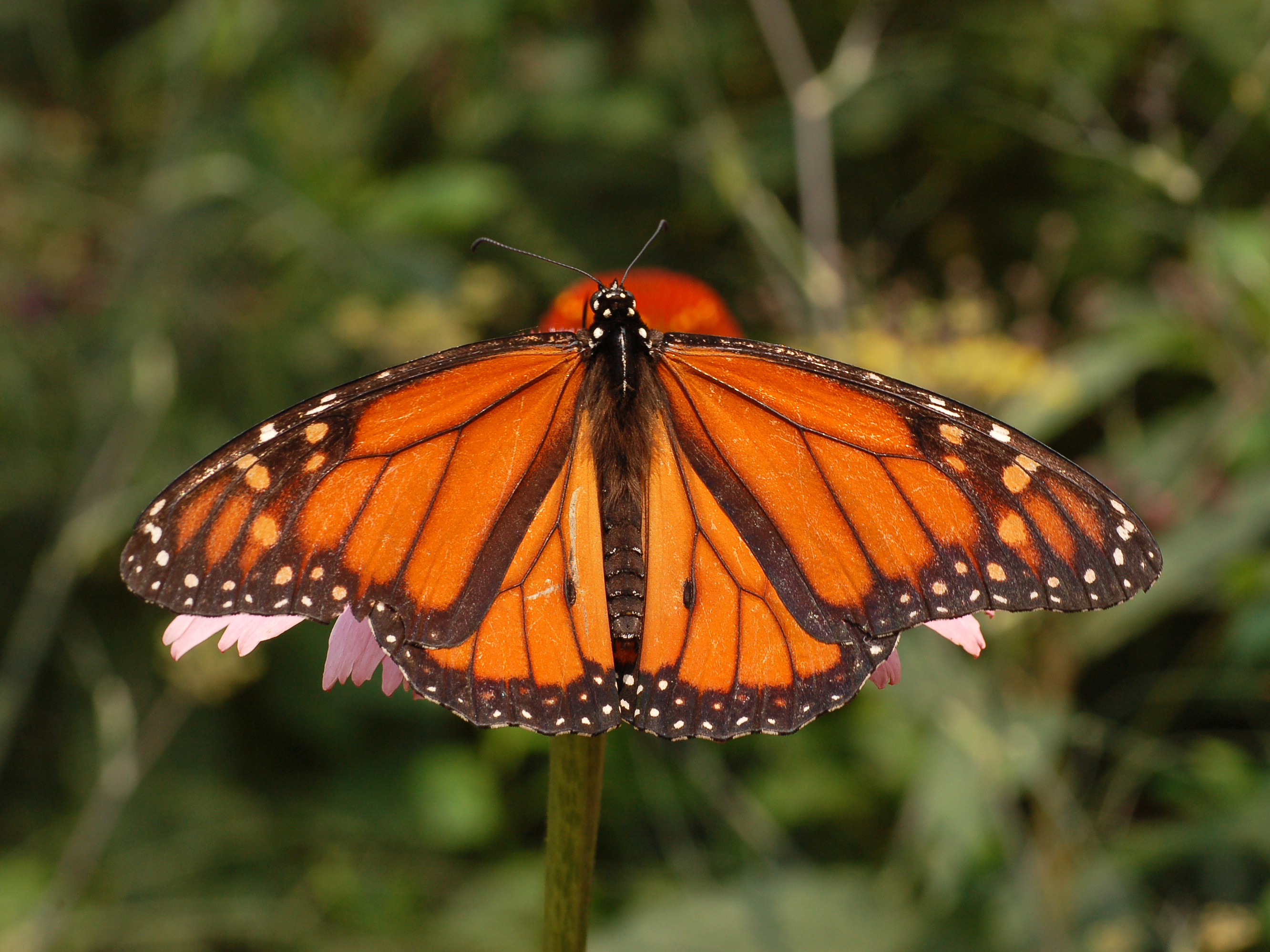
Monarch (Danaus plexippus)

Amongst the invertebrates, typical insects of the Moist Mixed Grassland ecoregion are monarch (Danaus plexippus), mosquito (Anopheles quadrimaculatus), rose curculio, yellow jacket wasp (Vespula pennsylvanica), sow bug (Malacostraca isopoda), bumblebee (Bombus ternarius), blue-winged olive (Ephemerella cornuta), daddy longlegs (Opiliones), dragonfly, grasshopper (Melanoplus differentialis), harvester ant (Pogonomyrmex), and two-spotted lady beetle (Adalia bipunctata). Gardeners and horticulturists have identified various hemipterans during the growing season affecting their cash crop such as aphids, including the pea aphid (Acyrthosiphon pisum), English grain aphid (Macrosiphum avenae), and green peach aphid (Myzus persicae), spruce gall adelgid (Adelges cooleyi),

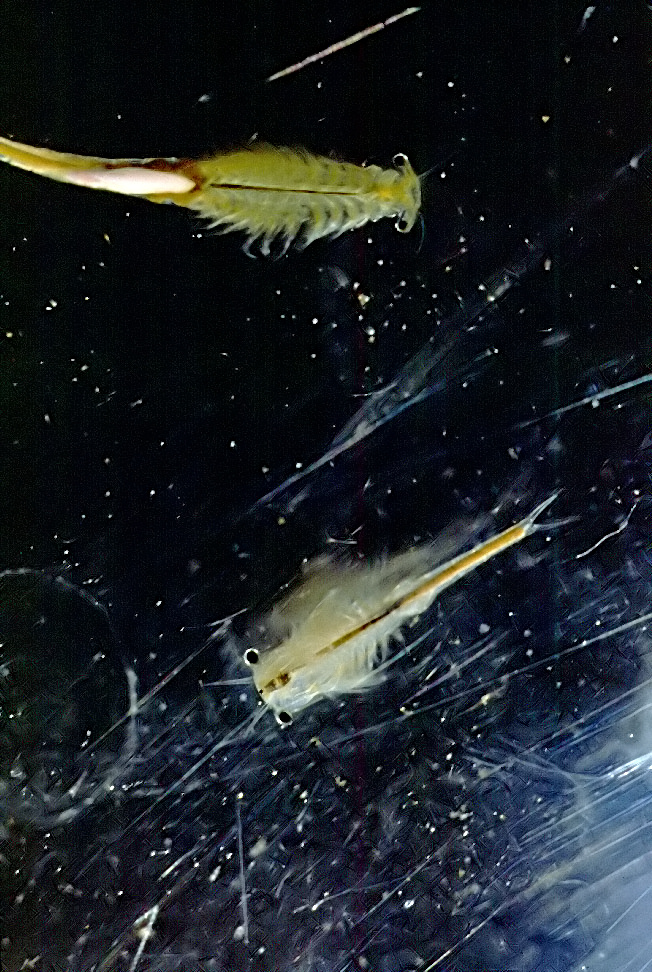
Fairy shrimp (Anostraca)

pine needle scale (Chionaspis pinifoliae), tomato psyllid (Bactericera cockerelli), greenhouse whitefly (Trialeurodes vaporariorum), aster leafhopper (Macrosteles quadrilineatus) alfalfa plant bug (Adelphocoris lineolatus), tarnished plant bug (Lygus lineolaris), and black grass bug (Labops hesperius). Freshwater invertebrates of Saskatchewan typically consist of clams (Pelycypoda) (Mollusca Bivalvia), mollusca (Gastropoda and Pelecypoda), leech (Hirudinea), freshwater earthworm Oligochaeta, virile crayfish (Faxonius virilis), Scud (Amphipoda), fairy shrimp (Anostraca), Copepod, water flea (Cladocera), clam shrimp (Conchostraca), water mite (Hydrachnida) caddisfly (Trichoptera), damselfly (Zygoptera), mayfly (Ephemeroptera), alderfly (Megaloptera), seed shrimp (Ostracod), and tadpole shrimp (Notostraca).

== Invasive species ==
The zebra mussel (Dreissena polymorpha), a non-native species is currently posing a serious threat to Saskatchewan waterways, as it has overtaken nearby freshwater habitats.

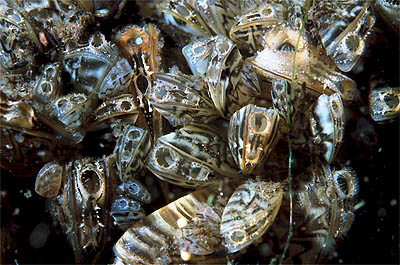
Zebra mussel (Dreissena polymorpha)

During the 1930s gophers (Richardson's ground squirrel, Spermophilus richardsonii, and thirteen-lined ground squirrel, Spermophilus tridecemlineatus) by the thousands were eating crops and burrowing holes which injured horses. The government offered a nickel for every tail turned in.

The Rocky Mountain locust (Melanoplus spretus) was a small invertebrate which darkened the skies. In 1875 they covered the American and Canadian plains eating everything in the grasslands. By 1902 they disappeared mysteriously and became extinct. Growing resistant crops, and utilising oats and peas are new methods of control where and when there are grasshopper (Camnula pellucida) outbreaks.

== Protected species ==
The burrowing owl (Athene cunicularia hypugaea) is an endangered species.

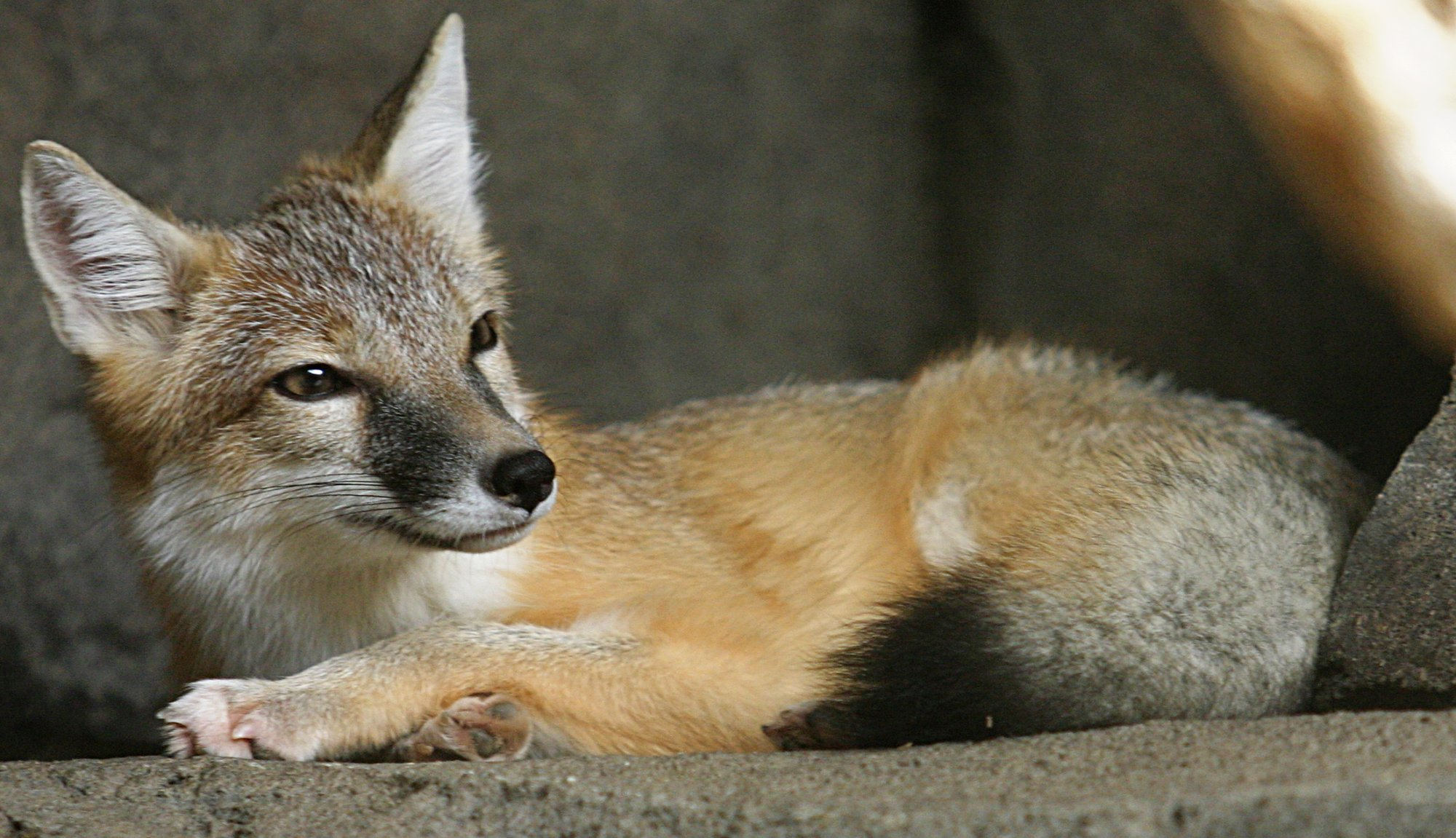
Swift fox (Vulpes velox)

They inhabit holes created by other animals such as Richardson's ground squirrel (gopher), prairie dog, fox, coyote, and badger. Their decline is due to habitat loss due to agricultural, residential and highway lands, and pesticide spraying. Another endangered species, the swift fox (Vulpes velox), has been bred in captivity and re-introduced into protected habitat areas. Lake sturgeon is a Species at Risk in the prairie provinces.

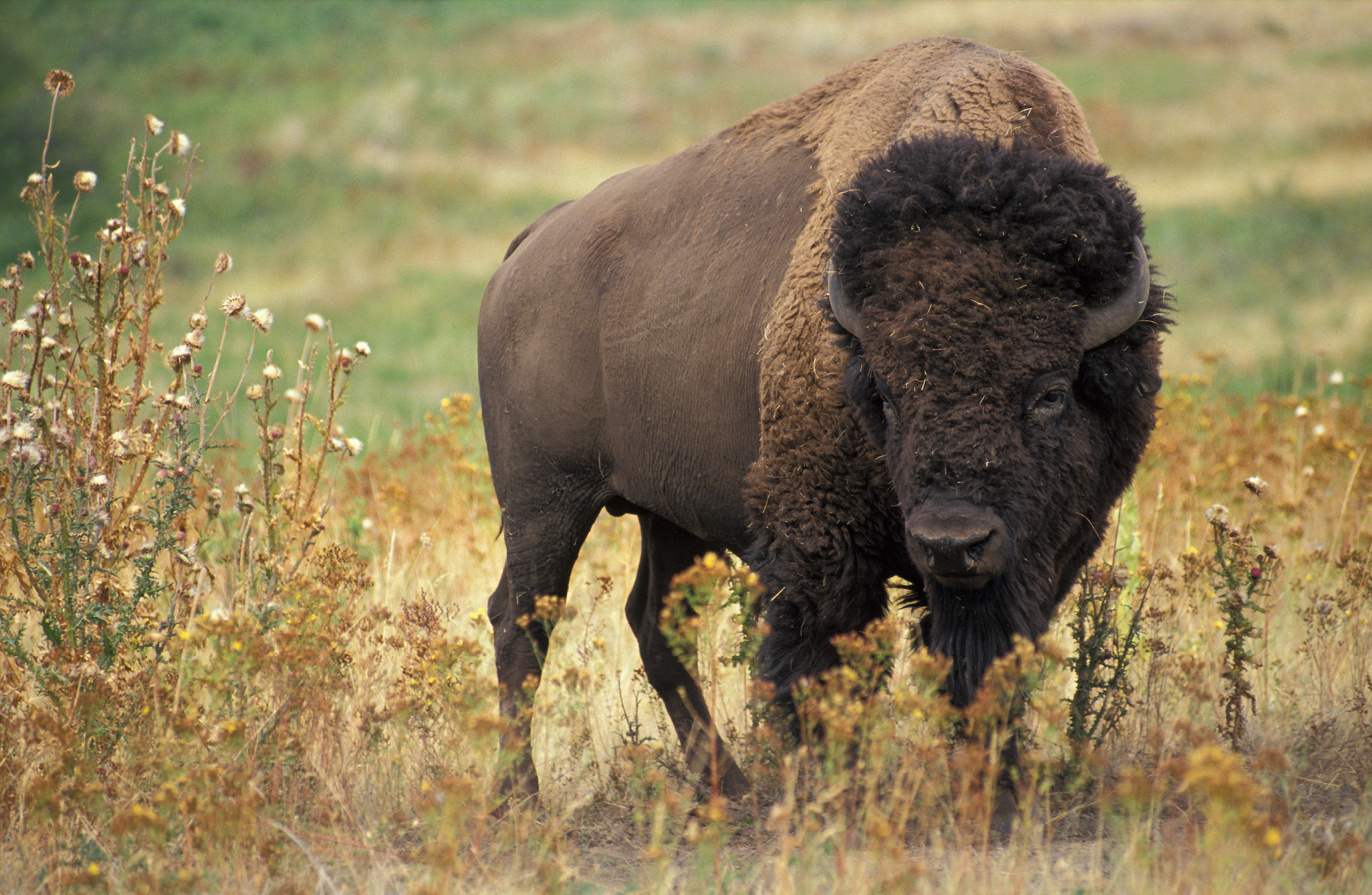
Buffalo (bison bison)

In 1691 the buffalo (bison bison) roamed the prairies by the thousands. "The Buffalo (were) so numerous (that the riders were) obliged to make them sheer out of our way." -Henday Bone beds have been uncovered showing mass kills of bison herds at the base of buffalo jumps and within wood and stone corrals. Habitat destruction from homesteaders breaking the land combined with hunting practices brought the huge population to near extinction. Similarly, vast flights of passenger pigeons (Ectopistes migratorius) were reported by Peter Fidler in the early 19th century. The sky darkened for hours as flocks of migrating pigeons passed. Forest habitat destruction and wholesale hunting brought the passenger pigeon to extinction. The eskimo curlew (Numenius borealis), a shorebird who was also seen historically in great numbers met a similar extinction due to changing habitats and diminishing numbers from hunting.

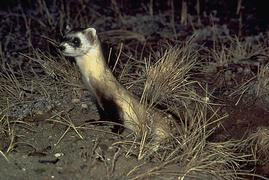
Black-footed ferret (Mustela nigripes)

Associated with the eradication program of the prairie dog (gopher) in the 1930s was the dramatic decline in population of the black-footed ferret (Mustela nigripes) which relied on the prairie dog as its main source of food. The lowered population was hastened as the natural habitat of the ferret was also being taken over by agricultural machinery and practices.

== Biodiversity conservation ==
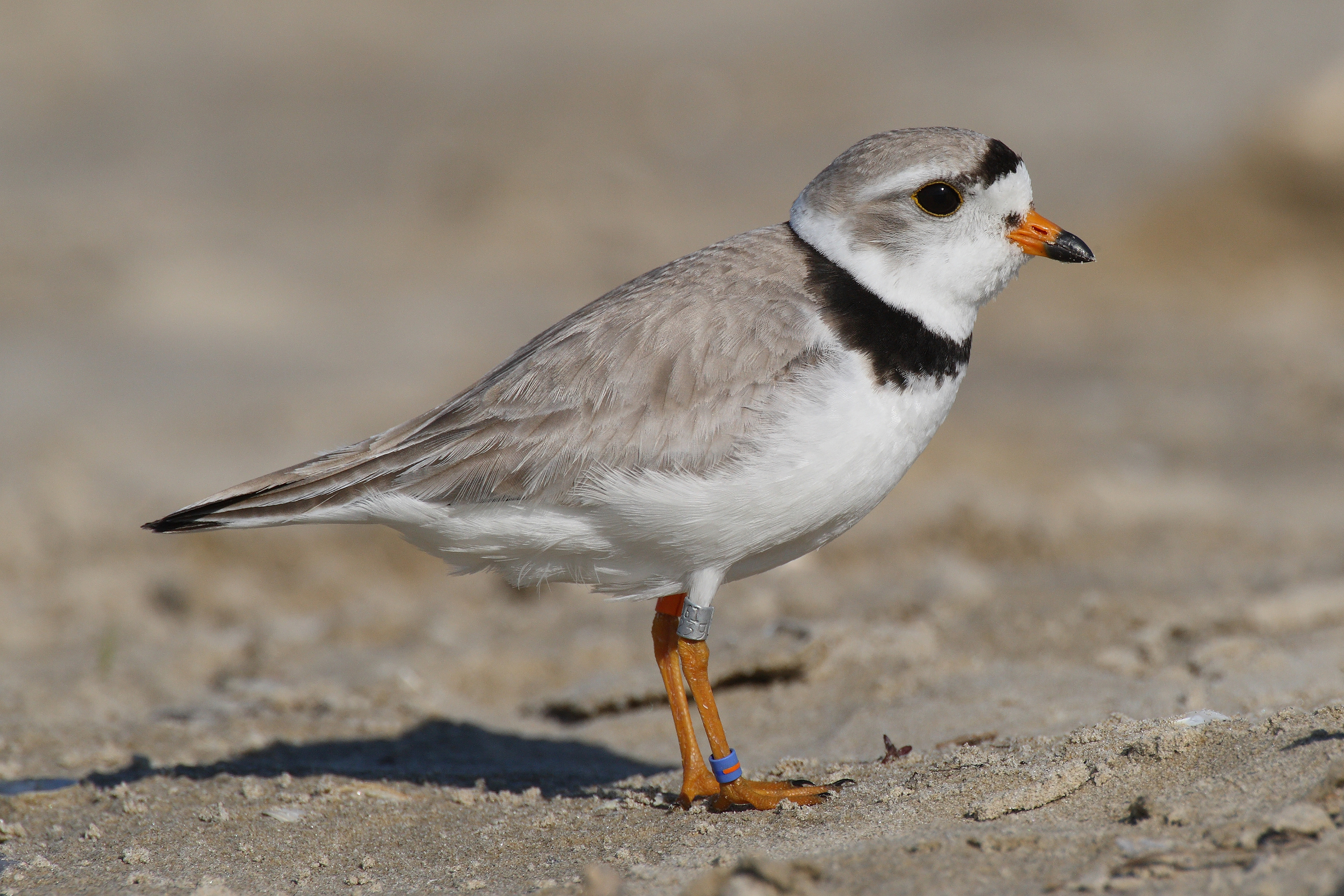
Piping plover (Charadrius melodus)

Chaplin, Old Wives, Reed Lakes (Hemispheric) - Western Hemisphere Shorebird Reserve Network (WHSRN) Site is a designated Hemispheric Shorebird Reserve Network protecting three saline lakes, saline and freshwater marshes. This area is a breeding site for the endangered piping plover. 67,000 other birds in over 30 species make use of this area. The Prince Albert National Park affords protection to a breeding ground of the American white pelican which has been designated as a threatened species. Quill Lakes International Bird Area which houses over one million shorebirds annually is a Ramsar international wetlands area recognized by the Western Hemisphere Shorebird Reserve Network Site (WHSRN). Redberry Lake World Biosphere Reserve is a United Nations saline lake bird sanctuary. Last Mountain Lake or Long Lake the first federal bird sanctuary, and the Dundurn Military Reserve are preserved areas of natural habitat. Protected areas include Cypress Hills Provincial Park, Douglas Provincial Park, Danielson Provincial Park, Blackstrap Provincial Park, Pike Lake Provincial Park. Approximately 80% of the wetlands in this ecoregion have been lost. The only Canadian colony of prairie dogs is protected in the Grasslands National Park. Ord's kangaroo rat (Dipodomys ordii) is found only in the Great Sand Hills. High populations of sharp-tailed grouse and mule deer reside in the Great Sand Hills area. The Aspen Parkland has been mainly converted to agricultural cropland and grazing lands. Bronson Forest is original parkland, Pasquia Hills provincial forest, Porcupine Forest, and Nisbet Forest are reserved tracts of land.

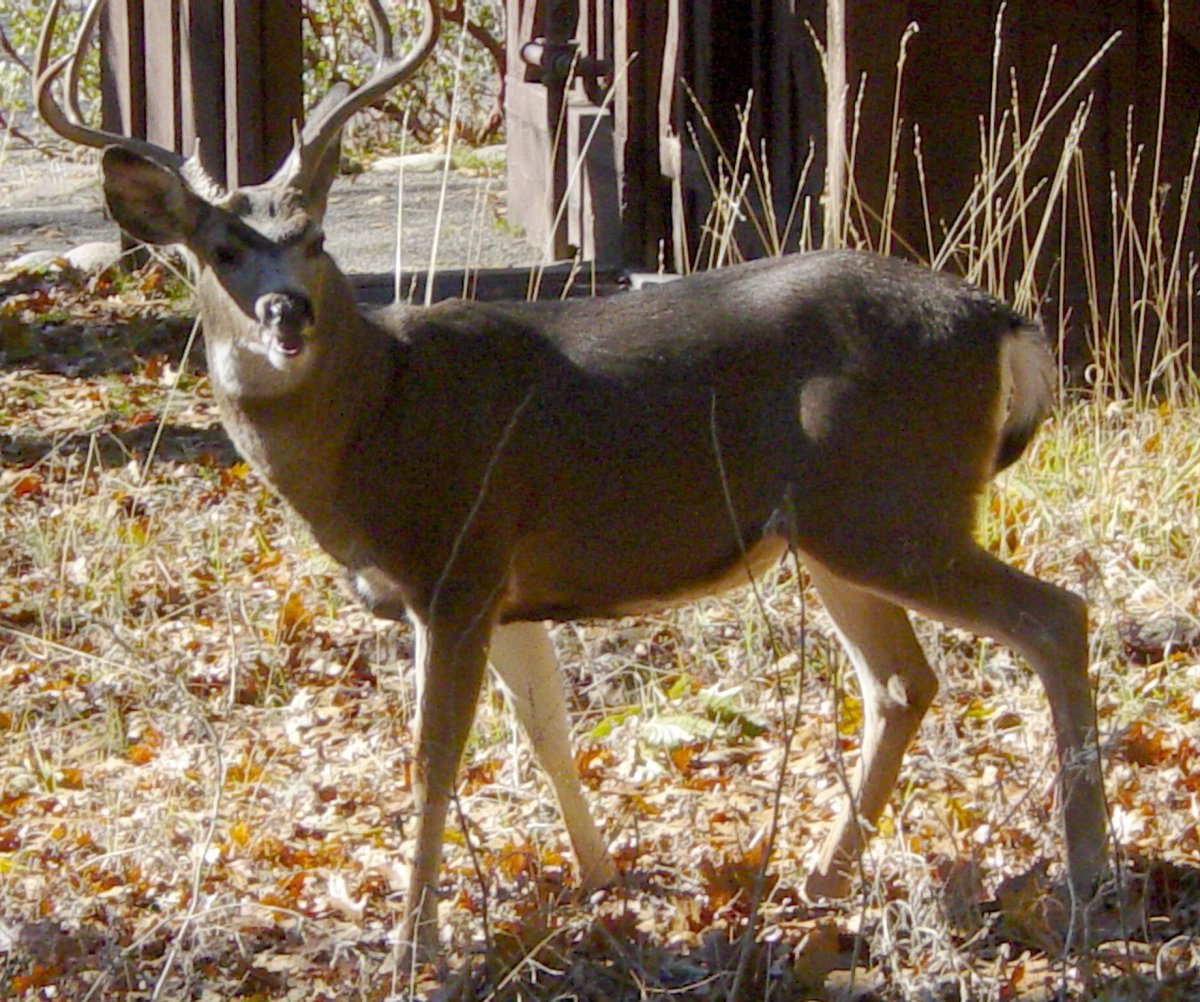
Mule deer (Odocoileus hemionus)

Highways are threat to wildlife populations. The porcupine's defense mechanism against predators is to crouch and raise quills which results in highway accidents and roadkill of this rodent. Deer and other large ungulates are a hazard to traffic resulting in potential animal or human deaths especially in the autumn mating months or when deer are searching for feeding grounds in the spring. The defense mechanism of deer in the face of a threat is to freeze. There are over 3,500 deer - auto collisions per year in Saskatchewan. A number of measures have been implemented to increase awareness such as fencing, feeding programs, automobile whistles. Saskatchewan Wildlife Federation has launched "Slow Down and Save a Buck" sign campaign. Deer mirrors along the edges of highways were installed for reducing deer-vehicle collisions. The Wildlife Warning System is triggered by highway vehicles, setting off lights, sounds and or odours ahead of the approaching vehicle to frighten away animals. A system that detects vehicle was installed in 2002 near Harris to reduce the quantity of mule deer - automobile accidents for a two-year testing period. Another system detects large animals and sets off a warning system to drivers of vehicles alerting them that an animal is on or near the highway ahead of time.

The major threats to natural habitat are logging, pesticide use and oil and gas exploration. Destruction of habitats by forestry or agriculture change population levels. Removal of forests raising prairieland increases the population of Aspen Parkland and prairie habitat animals. Increasing prairieland and reducing the boreal forest reduces animals which depend on the forest for survival. Trapping, shooting and poisoning are direct threats to mammals. Dumping sand, clearing vegetation on shorelines, leaking septic tanks, dams and weirs are threats to fish populations. Removal of forests to increase agricultural lands creates a habitat loss which is a threat to the avifauna population.

== Naturalists ==
Peter Fidler (1769–1822) naturalist, surveyed and mapped Saskatchewan and wrote reports on wildlife observation. Loring Woart Bailey (1839–1925), naturalist studied algae and identified diatoms in Saskatchewan. Archibald Stansfeld Belaney, Grey Owl (1888–1938) conservationist lived in the Prince Albert National Park and appeared in films advocating wildlife preservation.

== See also ==
- List of mammals in Saskatchewan
- Flora and fauna of the Maastrichtian stage
- Prehistoric birds of North America
- Wildlife of Canada
- Western Economic Diversification Canada
