= Alfred Bailey (poet) =

Canadian educator, poet, anthropologist, ethno-historian and administrator

Alfred Goldsworthy Bailey
- Born: March 18, 1905; Quebec City, Quebec, Canada
- Died: April 21, 1997 (aged 92); Fredericton, New Brunswick
- Education: University of New Brunswick, University of Toronto, London School of Economics
- Occupation: professor
- Relatives: Loring Woart Bailey, grandfather
- Writing career
- Language: English
- Notable work: Miramichi Lightning: Collected Poems
- Notable awards: FRSC, Order of Canada

Alfred Goldsworthy Bailey, OC FRSC (March 18, 1905 – April 21, 1997) was a Canadian educator, poet, anthropologist, ethno-historian, and academic administrator.

== Life ==
Born in Quebec City, Quebec, Canada, the son of Professor Loring Woart Bailey Jr. and Ernestine Valiant (Gale) Bailey, he received his BA degree in 1927 from the University of New Brunswick (UNB). He was editor of The High School of Quebec Magazine while in high school, and verse editor of The Brunswickian at UNB, and contributed poetry to both magazines.

Bailey then attended the University of Toronto, where he earned his MA in 1929. There he became friends with Earle Birney, Roy Daniells, and Robert Finch, and was introduced to the poetry of T.S. Eliot.

After graduating, Bailey worked as a reporter for the Toronto Mail and Empire. He returned to the University of Toronto to receive his Ph.D in 1934. He then spent a year on a Royal Society of Canada fellowship studying at the London School of Economics, where he was introduced to "leftist politics" and the poetry of Dylan Thomas.

From 1935 to 1938, he worked as assistant director and associate curator at the New Brunswick Museum in Saint John, New Brunswick.

In 1938, the president of UNB offered to make Bailey the head of a new Department of History if he could talk the provincial government into granting sufficient funding for it. Bailey was successful, and served as head of the new department for 30 years, until 1969.

Bailey instituted colonial American studies at the UNB; as a result a closer liaison developed between its history departments and that of the University of Maine in the 1960s. Visits between scholars from Atlantic Provinces and the University of Maine became frequent after the establishment of the New England - Atlantic Provinces Study Center at Orono in 1966.

Bailey worked hard at founding a literary community in New Brunswick, founding the Bliss Carman Society. The Society held its meetings at his home, and he kept minutes (including records of all poems). His mimeographed sheets of poems read at Society meetings eventually grew into a new literary magazine, The Fiddlehead, established in 1945 and now Canada's longest-running literary journal.

Alfred Bailey was Honorary Librarian and CEO of the UNB Library from 1946 to 1959. From 1946 to 1964, he was the first Dean of Arts at UNB, and from 1965 to 1969, he was Vice President (Academic). He retired in 1970.

He wrote poetry from college through retirement. His books of poetry include Songs of the Saguenay (1927), Tao (1930), Border River (1952), Thanks for a Drowned Island (1973), and Miramichi Lightning: The Collected Poems of Alfred G. Bailey (1981).

== Writing ==
=== History ===
Alfred Goldsworthy Bailey is esteemed for his seminal work in ethnohistory, The Conflict of European and Eastern Algonkian Cultures, 1504-1700: A Study in Canadian Civilization, his 1937 doctoral dissertation, republished by the University of Toronto in 1969. "In a sense," says the New Brunswick Literary Encyclopedia, "he created the field of ethnohistory in Canada."

His essay "Overture to Nationhood" in the Literary History of Canada (1965) (which he helped to edit) and his 1972 collection Culture and Nationality: Essays by A.G. Bailey, confirmed his status as cultural historian.

=== Poetry ===
The Canadian Encyclopedia says of his poetry: "From conservative beginnings that echoed strongly the romantic tones of late 19th-century verse, Bailey evolved into a contemporary poet whose statement was full of the surrounding reality, whose voice is, at times, deceptively subdued but whose imagination ranged widely and wisely.

== Recognition ==
On retirement, Bailey was appointed Professor Emeritus at UNB. He received three honorary doctorates. He has served on the Historic Sites and Monuments Board of Canada, the National Library advisory board, and the Governor General's Literary Awards committee.

In 1951, Bailey was elected a Fellow of the Royal Society of Canada. In 1978, he was made an Officer of the Order of Canada.

He is commemorated by the Alfred G. Bailey Poetry Prize, awarded annually by the Writers' Federation of New Brunswick; and by the Alfred G. Bailey Undergraduate Scholarship, awarded annually to a UNB student majoring in history.

Alfred Goldsworthy Bailey has had a formative influence on a generation of younger poets, notably Elizabeth Brewster, Fred Cogswell, and Robert Gibbs.

== Publications ==
=== Poetry ===
- Songs of the Saguenay and other poems. Quebec City: Chronicle-Telegraph Publications, 1927.
- Tao: A Ryerson Poetry Chap Book. Toronto: Ryerson Press, 1930.
- Border River. Toronto: McClelland and Stewart, 1952.
- Thanks for a Drowned Island Toronto: McClelland and Stewart, 1973.
- Miramichi Lightning: The Collected Poems of Alfred Bailey. Fredericton: Fiddlehead Poetry Books, 1981. nominated for a 1981 Governor General's Awards
- The sun the wind the summer field. Fredericton: Goose Lane Editions, 1996.

=== Prose ===
- The Conflict of European and Eastern Algonkian Culture 1504-1700: A Study in Canadian Civilization. University of Toronto, 1934; Rpt. (with two chapters omitted) Saint John, 1937; Rpt. Toronto: U of Toronto P, 1969.
- Culture and Nationality: Essays by A. G. Bailey. Toronto: McClelland and Stewart, 1972.
- "Overture to Nationhood." The Literary History of Canada. Toronto: U of Toronto P, 1976.
- The Letters of James and Ellen Robb: Portrait of a Fredericton Family in Early Victorian Times (1983)

Except where noted, bibliographic information courtesy St. Thomas University (New Brunswick).
