= List of mammals of Saskatchewan =

This is an incomplete list of mammals of Saskatchewan, those mammals native to or occasionally found in the province of Saskatchewan in Canada.

Having a temperate climate and a range of biomes, from prairie and grassland in the south, aspen parkland in the centre, and boreal forest in the north, as well as regional exceptions like the Great Sand Hills and Cypress Hills makes Saskatchewan home to a wide variety of mammal species. Its central location in the Prairie Provinces makes it a convergence point for the ranges of many species found in the east and west, as well, with its proximity to Montana and North Dakota, Saskatchewan serves as a northern range for several predominantly American species. While there are also many species endemic to Saskatchewan itself. There are seventy-two species of wild mammals presently found in the province, out of approximately 4,400 known in the world.

Saskatchewan recognizes one species as its official mammal, the white-tail deer. Provincial law protects numerous species. Those considered threatened species are denoted by (T) and those considered endangered species denoted by (E). Some species are believed to be extirpated from the province, denoted with (X). Several species have been introduced to Saskatchewan, and established permanent populations, denoted with (I).

== Bats (Chiroptera) ==
- Little brown bat (Myotis lucifugus)

== Carnivores (Carnivora) ==
=== Canines (Canidae) ===
- Coyote (Canis latrans)
- Red fox (Vulpes vulpes)
- Swift fox (Vulpes velox) (E)
- Grey wolf (Canis lupus)
  - Hudson Bay wolf (C. l. hudsonicus)
  - Northwestern wolf (C. l. occidentalis)

=== Bears (Ursidae) ===
- Black bear (Ursus americanus)
- Brown bear (Ursus arctos)
  - Grizzly bear (U. a. horribilis)

=== Raccoons (Procyonidae) ===
- Raccoon (Procyon lotor)

=== Mustelids (Mustelidae) ===
- Wolverine (Gulo gulo)
- River otter (Lontra canadensis)
- Black-footed ferret (Mustela nigripes) (E, X)
- Long-tailed weasel (Neogale frenata)
- Least weasel (Mustela nivalis)
- Mink (Neogale vison)
- Badger (Taxidea taxus)

=== Skunks (Mephitidae) ===
- Striped skunk (Mephitis mephitis)

=== Felines (Felidae) ===
- Canada lynx (Lynx canadensis)
- Bobcat (Lynx rufus)
- Cougar (Puma concolor) (T)

== Even-toed ungulates (Artiodactyla) ==
=== Deer (Cervidae) ===
- Moose (Alces alces)
- Elk (Cervus canadensis)
  - Manitoban elk, C. c. manitobensis
- Mule deer (Odocoileus hemionus)
- White-tailed deer (Odocoileus virginianus)
- Caribou (Rangifer tarandus)
  - Woodland caribou (R. t. caribou)
  - Barren-ground caribou (R. t. groenlandicus)

=== Pronghorn (Antilocapridae) ===
- Pronghorn (Antilocapra americana)

=== Sheep and bison (Bovidae) ===
- Bison (Bison bison) (T)

== Rodents (Rodentia) ==
=== Beavers (Castoridae) ===
- Beaver (Castor canidensis)

=== Mice (Cricetidae) ===
- Eastern deermouse (Peromyscus maniculatus)
- Western deermouse (Peromyscus sonoriensis)

=== Muskrats (Ondatra) ===
- Muskrat (Ondatra zibethicus)

=== Porcupines (Erethizontidae) ===
- North American porcupine (Erethizon dorsatum)

== See also ==
- List of amphibians of Saskatchewan
- List of birds of Saskatchewan
- List of fish of Saskatchewan
- List of reptiles of Saskatchewan
- Fauna of Saskatchewan
