= Loring Woart Bailey =

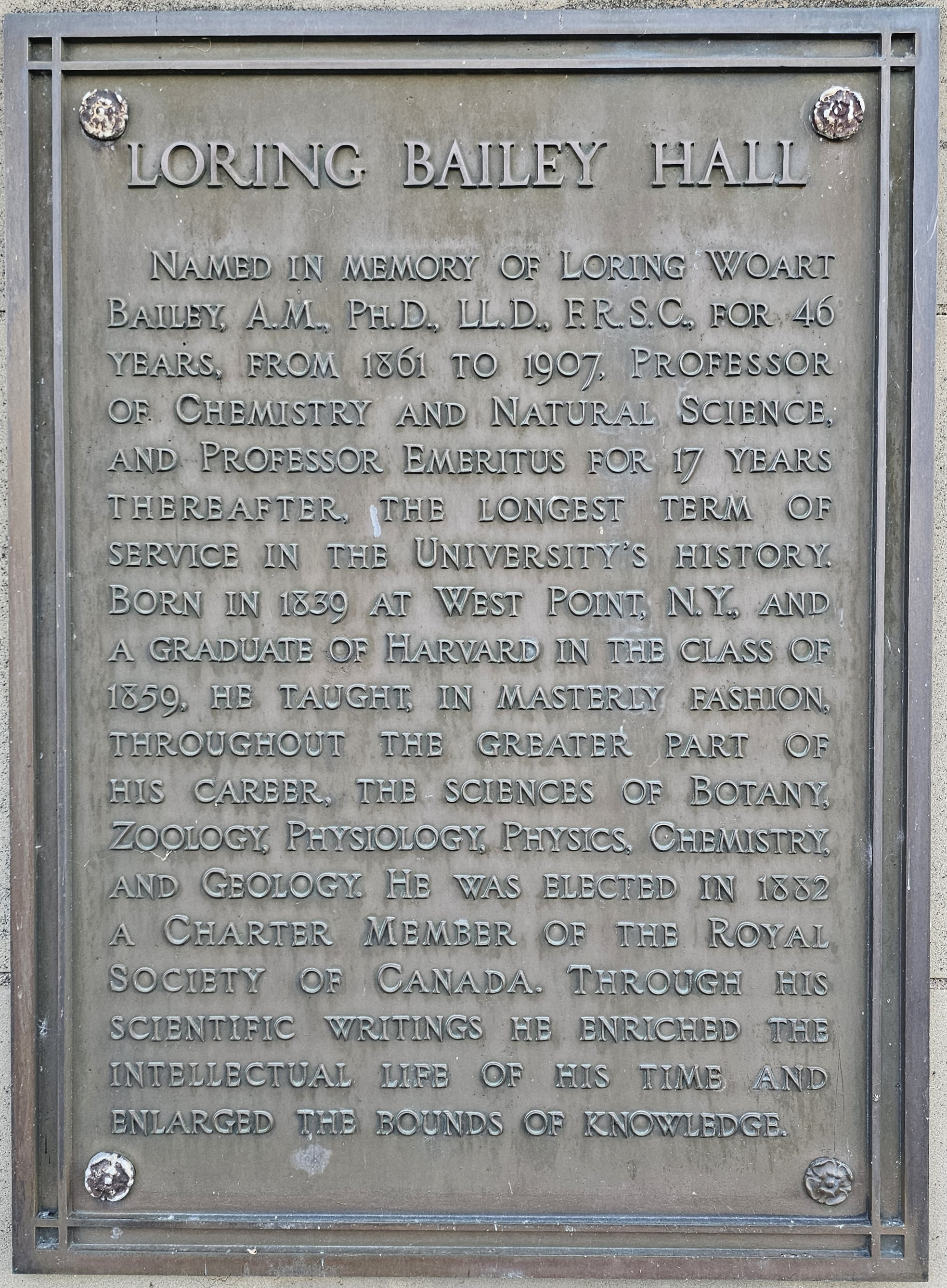
Plaque affixed to his namesake building on the campus of the University of New Brunswick

Loring Woart Bailey (28 September 1839 – 10 January 1925) was a geologist, botanist and university professor. He was born at West Point, New York, the son of a professor at the academy. He received a good education which was reinforced at home through interaction with his father and other academics. He studied at both Harvard University and Brown University and became a professor of chemistry and natural sciences at the University of New Brunswick.

Bailey had a 46-year teaching career at the University as well as much notable research in geology and in 1899 William Francis Ganong, a naturalist friend, named a mountain in New Brunswick after him.

In retirement, he pursued research in biology with a new enthusiasm and published scientific research on diatoms which was widely regarded. He published over 100 scientific works in his lifetime, a number of which were major works.

His grandson Alfred Bailey was an important poet and academic.
