= List of birds of Saskatchewan =

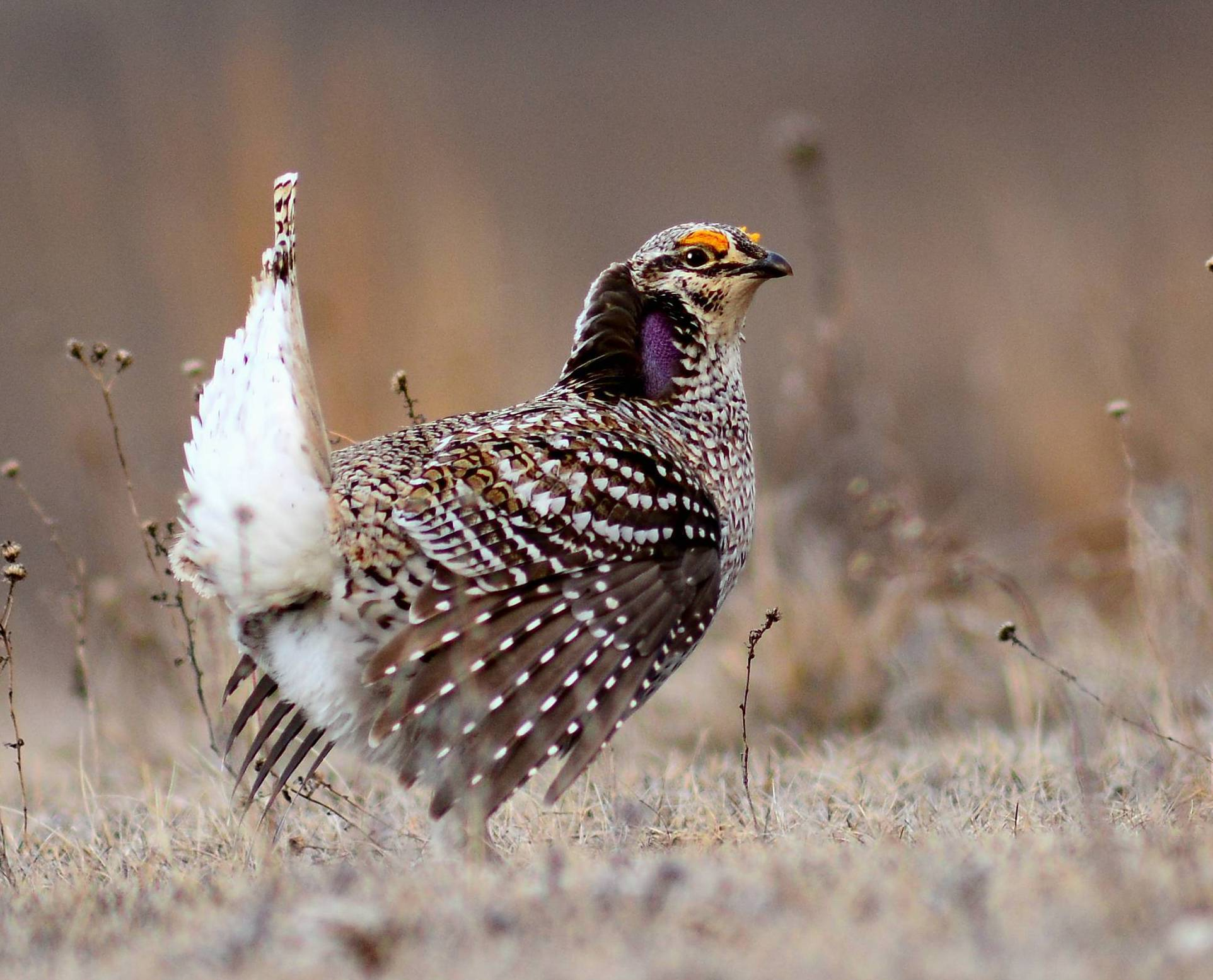
The sharp-tailed grouse is the official provincial bird of Saskatchewan.

This list of birds of Saskatchewan includes all the bird species confirmed in the Canadian province of Saskatchewan as determined by Nature Saskatchewan. As of September 2017, there were 436 species on the Nature Saskatchewan checklist. Of these species, 86 are considered stragglers and 43 are hypothetical; both terms are defined below. Ten species have been introduced to Saskatchewan or elsewhere in North America. One species is extinct, two have been extirpated, and another might be extinct.

This list is presented in the taxonomic sequence of the Check-list of North and Middle American Birds, 7th edition through the 62nd Supplement, published by the American Ornithological Society (AOS). Common and scientific names are also those of the Check-list, except that Canadian English spellings are used and the common names of families are from the Clements taxonomy because the AOS list does not include them.

The following tags are used to describe some categories of occurrence.

- (S) Straggler - species with 30 or fewer records per Nature Saskatchewan
- (H) Hypothetical - species lacking a specimen, photograph, or sound recording per Nature Saskatchewan; these also are "stragglers" but are not marked as such
- (I) Introduced - established solely as result of human intervention, either directly in Saskatchewan or elsewhere in North America

== Ducks, geese, and waterfowl ==
Order: Anseriformes Family: Anatidae

The family Anatidae includes ducks and most duck-like waterfowl, such as geese and swans. These birds are adapted to an aquatic existence with webbed feet, bills which are flattened to a greater or lesser extent, and feathers that are excellent at shedding water due to special oils.

- Emperor goose, Anser canagica (H)
- Snow goose, Anser caerulescens
- Ross's goose, Anser rossii
- Greater white-fronted goose, Anser albifrons
- Tundra bean-goose, Anser serrirostris (S)
- Bar-headed goose, Anser indicus (H) (Not on the AOS Check-list)
- Brant, Branta bernicla (S)
- Barnacle goose, Branta leucopsis (H)
- Cackling goose, Branta hutchinsii
- Canada goose, Branta canadensis
- Mute swan, Cygnus olor (I) (Extirpated)
- Trumpeter swan, Cygnus buccinator
- Tundra swan, Cygnus columbianus
- Wood duck, Aix sponsa
- Garganey, Spatula querquedula (S)
- Blue-winged teal, Spatula discors
- Cinnamon teal, Spatula cyanoptera
- Northern shoveler, Spatula clypeata
- Gadwall, Mareca strepera
- Eurasian wigeon, Mareca penelope (S)
- American wigeon, Mareca americana
- Mallard, Anas platyrhynchos
- American black duck, Anas rubripes
- Northern pintail, Anas bahamensis
- Green-winged teal, Anas crecca
- Canvasback, Aythya valisineria
- Redhead, Aythya americana
- Common pochard, Aythya ferina (H)
- Ring-necked duck, Aythya collaris
- Tufted duck, Aythya fuligula (H)
- Greater scaup, Aythya marila
- Lesser scaup, Aythya affinis
- King eider, Somateria spectabilis (S)
- Common eider, Somateria mollissima (S)
- Harlequin duck, Histrionicus histrionicus (S)
- Surf scoter, Melanitta perspicillata
- White-winged scoter, Melanitta deglandi
- Black scoter, Melanitta americana
- Long-tailed duck, Clangula hyemalis
- Bufflehead, Bucephala albeola
- Common goldeneye, Bucephala clangula
- Barrow's goldeneye, Bucephala islandica
- Hooded merganser, Lophodytes cucullatus
- Common merganser, Mergus merganser
- Red-breasted merganser, Mergus serrator
- Ruddy duck, Oxyura jamaicensis

== Pheasants, grouse, and allies ==
Order: Galliformes Family: Phasianidae

The Phasianidae is a family of birds which consists of pheasants, partridges, grouse, turkeys, and their allies. These are terrestrial species, variable in size but generally plump with broad relatively short wings. Many species are gamebirds or have been domesticated as a food source for humans.

- Wild turkey, Meleagris gallopavo (I)
- Ruffed grouse, Bonasa umbellus
- Greater sage-grouse, Centrocercus urophasianus
- Spruce grouse, Canachites canadensis
- Willow ptarmigan, Lagopus lagopus
- Rock ptarmigan, Lagopus muta (S)
- Sharp-tailed grouse, Tympanuchus phasianellus
- Greater prairie-chicken, Tympanuchus cupido (Extirpated)
- Grey partridge, Perdix perdix (I)
- Ring-necked pheasant, Phasianus colchicus (I)

== Grebes ==
Order: Podicipediformes Family: Podicipedidae

Grebes small to medium-large freshwater diving birds. They have lobed toes and are excellent swimmers and divers. However, they have their feet placed far back on the body, making them quite ungainly on land.

- Pied-billed grebe, Podilymbus podiceps
- Horned grebe, Podiceps auritus
- Red-necked grebe, Podiceps grisegena
- Eared grebe, Podiceps nigricollis
- Western grebe, Aechmorphorus occidentalis
- Clark's grebe, Aechmorphorus clarkii

== Pigeons and doves ==
Order: Columbiformes Family: Columbidae

Pigeons and doves are stout-bodied birds with short necks and short slender bills with a fleshy cere.

- Rock pigeon (feral), Columba livia (I)
- Band-tailed pigeon, Patagioenas fasciata (S)
- Eurasian collared-dove, Streptopelia decaocto (I)
- Passenger pigeon, Ectopistes migratorius (Extinct)
- White-winged dove, Zenaida asiatica (S)
- Mourning dove, Zenaida macroura

== Cuckoos ==
Order: Cuculiformes Family: Cuculidae

The family Cuculidae includes cuckoos, roadrunners, and anis. These birds are of variable size with slender bodies, long tails, and strong legs.

- Yellow-billed cuckoo, Coccyzus americanus (S)
- Black-billed cuckoo, Coccyzus erythropthalmus

== Nightjars and allies ==
Order: Caprimulgiformes Family: Caprimulgidae

Nightjars are medium-sized ground-nesting nocturnal birds with long wings, short legs, and very short bills. Most have small feet, of little use for walking, and long pointed wings. Their soft plumage is camouflaged to resemble bark or leaves.

- Common nighthawk, Chordeiles minor
- Common poorwill, Phalaenoptilus nuttallii
- Eastern whip-poor-will, Antrostomus vociferus

== Swifts ==
Order: Apodiformes Family: Apodidae

Swifts are small birds which spend the majority of their lives flying. These birds have very short legs and never settle voluntarily on the ground, perching instead only on vertical surfaces. Many swifts have long swept-back wings which resemble a crescent or boomerang.

- Black swift, Cypseloides niger (H)
- Chimney swift, Chaetura pelagica

== Hummingbirds ==
Order: Apodiformes Family: Trochilidae

Hummingbirds are small birds capable of hovering in mid-air due to the rapid flapping of their wings. They are the only birds that can fly backward.

- Ruby-throated hummingbird, Archilochus colubris
- Black-chinned hummingbird, Archilochus alexandri (H)
- Anna's hummingbird, Calypte anna (S)
- Calliope hummingbird, Selasphorus calliope (S)
- Rufous hummingbird, Selasphorus rufus (S)

== Rails, gallinules, and coots ==
Order: Gruiformes Family: Rallidae

Rallidae is a large family of small to medium-sized birds which includes the rails, crakes gallinules, and coots. The most typical family members occupy dense vegetation in damp environments near lakes, swamps, or rivers. In general, they are shy and secretive birds, making them difficult to observe. Most species have strong legs and long toes which are well adapted to soft uneven surfaces. They tend to have short, rounded wings and to be weak fliers.

- Virginia rail, Rallus limicola
- Sora, Porzana carolina
- American coot, Fulica americana
- Yellow rail, Coturnicops noveboracensis
- Black rail, Laterallus jamaicensis (H)

== Cranes ==
Order: Gruiformes Family: Gruidae

Cranes are large, long-legged, and long-necked birds. Unlike the similar-looking but unrelated herons, cranes fly with necks outstretched, not pulled back. Most have elaborate and noisy courting displays or "dances".

- Sandhill crane, Antigone canadensis
- Common crane, Grus grus (S)
- Whooping crane, Grus americana

== Stilts and avocets ==
Order: Charadriiformes Family: Recurvirostridae

Recurvirostridae is a family of large wading birds, which includes the avocets and stilts. The avocets have long legs and long up-curved bills. The stilts have extremely long legs and long, thin, straight bills.

- Black-necked stilt, Himantopus mexicanus
- American avocet, Recurvirostra americana

== Plovers and lapwings ==
Order: Charadriiformes Family: Charadriidae

Charadriidae includes the plovers, dotterels, and lapwings. They are small to medium-sized birds with compact bodies, short thick necks, and long, usually pointed, wings. They are found in open country worldwide, mostly in habitats near water.

- Black-bellied plover, Pluvialis squatarola
- American golden-plover, Pluvialis dominica
- Pacific golden-plover, Pluvialis fulva (H)
- Killdeer, Charadrius vociferus
- Semipalmated plover, Charadrius semipalmatus
- Piping plover, Charadrius melodus
- Snowy plover, Charadrius nivosus (S)
- Mountain plover, Charadrius montanus (S)

== Sandpipers and allies ==
Order: Charadriiformes Family: Scolopacidae

Scolopacidae is a large diverse family of small to medium-sized shorebirds including the sandpipers, curlews, godwits, shanks, tattlers, woodcocks, snipes, dowitchers, and phalaropes. The majority of these species eat small invertebrates picked out of the mud or soil. Variation in length of legs and bills enables multiple species to feed in the same habitat, particularly on the coast, without direct competition for food.

- Upland sandpiper, Bartramia longicauda
- Whimbrel, Numenius phaeopus
- Eskimo curlew, Numenius borealis (H) (Possibly extinct)
- Long-billed curlew, Numenius americanus
- Bar-tailed godwit, Limosa lapponica (S)
- Hudsonian godwit, Limosa haemastica
- Marbled godwit, Limosa fedoa
- Ruddy turnstone, Arenaria interpres
- Red knot, Calidris canutus
- Surfbird, Calidris virgata (H)
- Ruff, Calidris pugnax (S)
- Sharp-tailed sandpiper, Calidris acuminata (H)
- Stilt sandpiper, Calidris himantopus
- Curlew sandpiper, Calidris ferruginea (H)
- Red-necked stint, Calidris ruficollis (H)
- Sanderling, Calidris alba
- Dunlin, Calidris alpina
- Rock sandpiper, Calidris ptilocnemis (H)
- Baird's sandpiper, Calidris bairdii
- Least sandpiper, Calidris minutilla
- White-rumped sandpiper, Calidris fuscicollis
- Buff-breasted sandpiper, Calidris subruficollis
- Pectoral sandpiper, Calidris melanotos
- Semipalmated sandpiper, Calidris pusilla
- Western sandpiper, Calidris mauri (S)
- Short-billed dowitcher, Limnodromus griseus
- Long-billed dowitcher, Limnodromus scolopaceus
- American woodcock, Scolopax minor (S)
- Wilson's snipe, Gallinago delicata
- Spotted sandpiper, Actitis macularia
- Solitary sandpiper, Tringa solitaria
- Lesser yellowlegs, Tringa flavipes
- Willet, Tringa semipalmata
- Spotted redshank, Tringa erythropus (S)
- Greater yellowlegs, Tringa melanoleuca
- Wilson's phalarope, Phalaropus tricolor
- Red-necked phalarope, Phalaropus lobatus
- Red phalarope, Phalaropus fulicarius (S)

== Skuas and jaegers ==
Order: Charadriiformes Family: Stercorariidae

The family Stercorariidae are large birds, typically with grey or brown plumage, often with white markings on the wings. They have longish bills with hooked tips and webbed feet with sharp claws. They look like large dark gulls, but have a fleshy cere above the upper mandible. They are strong, acrobatic fliers.

- Pomarine jaeger, Stercorarius pomarinus (S)
- Parasitic jaeger, Stercorarius parasiticus
- Long-tailed jaeger, Stercorarius longicaudus (S)

== Auks, murres, and puffins ==
Order: Charadriiformes Family: Alcidae

Alcids are superficially similar to penguins due to their black-and-white colours, their upright posture, and some of their habits. However, they are only distantly related to the penguins and are able to fly. Auks live on the open sea, only deliberately coming ashore to nest.

- Black guillemot, Cepphus grylle (S)
- Pigeon guillemot, Cepphus columba (H)
- Long-billed murrelet, Brachyramphus perdix (H)
- Ancient murrelet, Synthliboramphus antiquus (S)

== Gulls, terns, and skimmers ==
Order: Charadriiformes Family: Laridae

Laridae is a family of medium to large seabirds and includes gulls, terns, kittiwakes, and skimmers. They are typically grey or white, often with black markings on the head or wings. They have stout, longish bills and webbed feet.

- Black-legged kittiwake, Rissa tridactyla (S)
- Ivory gull, Pagophila eburnea (H)
- Sabine's gull, Xema sabini (S)
- Bonaparte's gull, Chroicocephalus philadelphia
- Little gull, Hydrocoloeus minutus (S)
- Ross's gull, Rhodostethia rosea (S)
- Laughing gull, Leucophaeus atricilla (H)
- Franklin's gull, Leucophaeus pipixcan
- Short-billed gull, Larus brachyrhynchus
- Ring-billed gull, Larus delawarensis
- Western gull, Larus occidentalis (S)
- California gull, Larus californicus
- Herring gull, Larus argentatus
- Iceland gull, Larus glaucoides
- Lesser black-backed gull, Larus fuscus (S)
- Slaty-backed gull, Larus schistisagus (S)
- Glaucous-winged gull, Larus glaucescens (H)
- Glaucous gull, Larus hyperboreus
- Great black-backed gull, Larus marinus (S)
- Least tern, Sternula antillarum (S)
- Caspian tern, Hydroprogne caspia
- Black tern, Chlidonias niger
- Common tern, Sterna hirundo
- Arctic tern, Sterna paradisaea
- Forster's tern, Sterna forsteri

== Loons ==
Order: Gaviiformes Family: Gaviidae

Loons, known as divers in Europe, are aquatic birds the size of a large duck, to which they are unrelated. Their plumage is largely grey or black, and they have spear-shaped bills. Loons swim well and fly adequately, but, because their legs are placed towards the rear of the body, are almost helpless on land.

- Red-throated loon, Gavia stellata
- Pacific loon, Gavia pacifica
- Common loon, Gavia immer
- Yellow-billed loon, Gavia adamsii (S)

== Frigatebirds ==
Order: Suliformes Family: Fregatidae

Frigatebirds are large seabirds usually found over tropical oceans. They are large, black, or black-and-white, with long wings and deeply forked tails. The males have coloured inflatable throat pouches. They do not swim or walk and cannot take off from a flat surface. Having the largest wingspan-to-body-weight ratio of any bird, they are essentially aerial, able to stay aloft for more than a week.

- Magnificent frigatebird, Fregata magnificens (S)

== Cormorants and shags ==
Order: Suliformes Family: Phalacrocoracidae

Cormorants are medium-to-large aquatic birds, usually with mainly dark plumage and areas of coloured skin on the face. The bill is long, thin and sharply hooked. Their feet are four-toed and webbed.

- Double-crested cormorant, Nannopterum auritum

== Pelicans ==
Order: Pelecaniformes Family: Pelecanidae

Pelicans are very large water birds with a distinctive pouch under their beak. Like other birds in the order Pelecaniformes, they have four webbed toes.

- American white pelican, Pelecanus erythrorhynchos

== Herons, egrets, and bitterns ==
Order: Pelecaniformes Family: Ardeidae

The family Ardeidae contains the bitterns, herons, and egrets. Herons and egrets are medium to large wading birds with long necks and legs. Bitterns tend to be shorter necked and warier. Unlike other long-necked birds such as storks, ibises, and spoonbills, members of this family fly with their necks retracted.

- American bittern, Botaurus lentiginosus
- Least bittern, Ixobrychus exilis (S)
- Great blue heron, Ardea herodias
- Great egret, Ardea alba
- Snowy egret, Egretta thula (S)
- Little blue heron, Egretta caerulea (S)
- Tricolored heron, Egretta tricolor (S)
- Cattle egret, Bubulcus ibis
- Green heron, Butorides virescens (S)
- Black-crowned night-heron, Nycticorax nycticorax
- Yellow-crowned night-heron, Nyctanassa violacea (S)

== Ibises and spoonbills ==
Order: Pelecaniformes Family: Threskiornithidae

Threskiornithidae is a family of large terrestrial and wading birds which comprises the ibises and spoonbills. Its members have long, broad wings with 11 primary and about 20 secondary flight feathers. They are strong fliers and, despite their size and weight, very capable soarers.

- Glossy ibis, Plegadis falcinellus (H)
- White-faced ibis, Plegadis chihi

== New World vultures ==
Order: Cathartiformes Family: Cathartidae

The New World vultures are not closely related to Old World vultures, but superficially resemble them because of convergent evolution. Like the Old World vultures, they are scavengers. However, unlike Old World vultures, which find carcasses by sight, New World vultures have a good sense of smell with which they locate carcasses.

- Black vulture, Coragyps atratus (H)
- Turkey vulture, Cathartes aura

== Osprey ==
Order: Accipitriformes Family: Pandionidae

Pandionidae is a family of fish-eating birds of prey possessing a very large, powerful hooked beak for tearing flesh from their prey, strong legs, powerful talons, and keen eyesight. The family is monotypic.

- Osprey, Pandion haliaetus

== Hawks, eagles, and kites ==
Order: Accipitriformes Family: Accipitridae

The Accipitridae is a family of birds of prey which includes hawks, eagles, kites, harriers, and Old World vultures. These birds mostly have powerful hooked beaks for tearing flesh from their prey, strong legs, powerful talons, and keen eyesight.

- White-tailed kite, Elanus leucurus (S)
- Swallow-tailed kite, Elanoides forficatus (H)
- Golden eagle, Aquila chrysaetos
- Northern harrier, Circus hudsonius
- Sharp-shinned hawk, Accipiter striatus
- Cooper's hawk, Accipiter cooperii
- American goshawk, Accipiter atricapillus
- Bald eagle, Haliaeetus leucocephalus
- Mississippi kite, Ictinia mississippiensis (S)
- Red-shouldered hawk, Buteo lineatus (H)
- Broad-winged hawk, Buteo platypterus
- Swainson's hawk, Buteo swainsoni
- Red-tailed hawk, Buteo jamaicensis
- Rough-legged hawk, Buteo lagopus
- Ferruginous hawk, Buteo regalis

== Barn-owls ==
Order: Strigiformes Family: Tytonidae

Barn-owls are medium to large owls with large heads and characteristic heart-shaped faces. They have long strong legs with powerful talons.

- Western barn owl, Tyto alba (S)

== Owls ==
Order: Strigiformes Family: Strigidae

The typical owls are small to large solitary nocturnal birds of prey. They have large forward-facing eyes and ears, a hawk-like beak, and a conspicuous circle of feathers around each eye called a facial disk.

- Western screech-owl, Megascops kennicottii (H)
- Eastern screech-owl, Megascops asio
- Great horned owl, Bubo virginianus
- Snowy owl, Bubo scandiacus
- Northern hawk owl, Surnia ulula
- Northern pygmy-owl, Glaucidium gnoma (S)
- Burrowing owl, Athene cunicularia
- Barred owl, Strix varia
- Great grey owl, Strix nebulosa
- Long-eared owl, Asio otus
- Short-eared owl, Asio flammeus
- Boreal owl, Aegolius funereus
- Northern saw-whet owl, Aegolius acadicus

== Kingfishers ==
Order: Coraciiformes Family: Alcedinidae

Kingfishers are medium-sized birds with large heads, long pointed bills, short legs, and stubby tails.

- Belted kingfisher, Megaceryle alcyon

== Woodpeckers ==
Order: Piciformes Family: Picidae

Woodpeckers, sapsuckers, and flickers are small to medium-sized birds with chisel-like beaks, short legs, stiff tails, and long tongues used for capturing insects. Some species have feet with two toes pointing forward and two backward, while several species have only three toes. Many woodpeckers have the habit of tapping noisily on tree trunks with their beaks.

- Lewis's woodpecker, Melanerpes lewis (S)
- Red-headed woodpecker, Melanerpes erythrocephalus
- Red-bellied woodpecker, Melanerpes carolinus (S)
- Williamson's sapsucker, Sphyrapicus thyroideus (S)
- Yellow-bellied sapsucker, Sphyrapicus varius
- Red-naped sapsucker, Sphyrapicus nuchalis
- American three-toed woodpecker, Picoides dorsalis
- Black-backed woodpecker, Picoides arcticus
- Downy woodpecker, Dryobates pubescens
- Hairy woodpecker, Dryobates villosus
- Northern flicker, Colaptes auratus
- Pileated woodpecker, Dryocopus pileatus

== Falcons and caracaras ==
Order: Falconiformes Family: Falconidae

Falconidae is a family of diurnal birds of prey, notably the falcons and caracaras. They differ from hawks, eagles, and kites in that they kill with their beaks instead of their talons.

- Crested caracara, Caracara plancus (S)
- American kestrel, Falco sparverius
- Merlin, Falco columbarius
- Gyrfalcon, Falco rusticolus
- Peregrine falcon, Falco peregrinus
- Prairie falcon, Falco mexicanus

== Tyrant flycatchers ==
Order: Passeriformes Family: Tyrannidae

Tyrant flycatchers are Passerine birds which occur throughout North and South America. They superficially resemble the Old World flycatchers, but are more robust and have stronger bills. They do not have the sophisticated vocal capabilities of the songbirds. Most are rather plain. As the name implies, most are insectivorous.

- Great crested flycatcher, Myiarchus crinitus
- Tropical kingbird, Tyrannus melancholicus (S)
- Western kingbird, Tyrannus verticalis
- Eastern kingbird, Tyrannus tyrannus
- Scissor-tailed flycatcher, Tyrannus forficatus (S)
- Fork-tailed flycatcher, Tyrannus savana (H)
- Olive-sided flycatcher, Contopus cooperi
- Western wood-pewee, Contopus sordidulus
- Eastern wood-pewee, Contopus virens
- Yellow-bellied flycatcher, Empidonax flaviventris
- Alder flycatcher, Empidonax alnorum
- Willow flycatcher, Empidonax traillii
- Least flycatcher, Empidonax minimus
- Grey flycatcher, Empidonax wrightii (H)
- Dusky flycatcher, Empidonax oberholseri
- Western flycatcher, Empidonax difficilis (S)
- Eastern phoebe, Sayornis phoebe
- Say's phoebe, Sayornis saya

== Vireos, shrike-babblers, and erpornis ==
Order: Passeriformes Family: Vireonidae

The vireos are a group of small to medium-sized passerine birds. They are typically greenish in colour and resemble wood-warblers apart from their heavier bills.

- White-eyed vireo, Vireo griseus (S)
- Yellow-throated vireo, Vireo flavifrons
- Cassin's vireo, Vireo cassinii (S)
- Blue-headed vireo, Vireo solitarius
- Plumbeous vireo, Vireo plumbeus (H)
- Philadelphia vireo, Vireo philadelphicus
- Warbling vireo, Vireo gilvus
- Red-eyed vireo, Vireo olivaceus

== Shrikes ==
Order: Passeriformes Family: Laniidae

Shrikes are passerine birds known for the habit of catching other birds and small animals and impaling the uneaten portions of their bodies on thorns. A shrike's beak is hooked, like that of a typical bird of prey.

- Loggerhead shrike, Lanius ludovicianus
- Northern shrike, Lanius borealis

== Crows, jays, and magpies ==
Order: Passeriformes Family: Corvidae

The family Corvidae includes crows, ravens, jays, choughs, magpies, treepies, nutcrackers, and ground jays. Corvids are above average in size among the Passeriformes, and some of the larger species show high levels of intelligence.

- Canada jay, Perisoreus canadensis
- Pinyon jay, Gymnorhinus cyanocephalus (H)
- Steller's jay, Cyanocitta stelleri (S)
- Blue jay, Cyanocitta cristata
- Clark's nutcracker, Nucifraga columbiana (S)
- Black-billed magpie, Pica hudsonia
- American crow, Corvus brachyrhynchos
- Common raven, Corvus corax

== Tits, chickadees, and titmice ==
Order: Passeriformes Family: Paridae

Chickadees and titmice are mainly small stocky woodland species with short stout bills. Some have crests. They are adaptable birds, with a mixed diet including seeds and insects.

- Black-capped chickadee, Poecile atricapilla
- Mountain chickadee, Poecile gambeli (S)
- Boreal chickadee, Poecile hudsonica
- Bridled titmouse, Baeolophus wollweberi (H)
- Tufted titmouse, Baeolophus bicolor (H)

== Larks ==
Order: Passeriformes Family: Alaudidae

Larks are small terrestrial birds with often extravagant songs and display flights. Most larks are fairly dull in appearance. Their food is insects and seeds.

- Horned lark, Eremophila alpestris

== Swallows ==
Order: Passeriformes Family: Hirundinidae

The family Hirundinidae is a group of passerines characterised by their adaptation to aerial feeding. These adaptations include a slender streamlined body, long pointed wings, and short bills with a wide gape. The feet are adapted to perching rather than walking, and the front toes are partially joined at the base.

- Bank swallow, Riparia riparia
- Tree swallow, Tachycineta bicolor
- Violet-green swallow, Tachycineta thalassina (A)
- Northern rough-winged swallow, Stelgidopteryx serripennis
- Purple martin, Progne subis
- Barn swallow, Hirundo rustica
- Cliff swallow, Petrochelidon pyrrhonota

== Kinglets ==
Order: Passeriformes Family: Regulidae

The kinglets are a small family of birds which resemble the titmice. They are very small insectivorous birds. The adults have coloured crowns, giving rise to their name.

- Ruby-crowned kinglet, Corthylio calendula
- Golden-crowned kinglet, Regulus satrapa

== Waxwings ==
Order: Passeriformes Family: Bombycillidae

The waxwings are a group of birds with soft silky plumage and unique red tips to some of the wing feathers. In the Bohemian and cedar waxwings, these tips look like sealing wax and give the group its name. These are arboreal birds of northern forests.

- Bohemian waxwing, Bombycilla garrulus
- Cedar waxwing, Bombycilla cedrorum

== Nuthatches ==
Order: Passeriformes Family: Sittidae

Nuthatches are small woodland birds. They have the unusual ability to climb down trees head first, unlike other birds which can only go upwards. Nuthatches have big heads, short tails, and powerful bills and feet.

- Red-breasted nuthatch, Sitta canadensis
- White-breasted nuthatch, Sitta carolinensis
- Pygmy nuthatch, Sitta pygmaea (H)

== Treecreepers ==
Order: Passeriformes Family: Certhiidae

Treecreepers are small woodland birds, brown above and white below. They have thin pointed down-curved bills, which they use to extricate insects from bark. They have stiff tail feathers, like woodpeckers, which they use to support themselves on vertical trees.

- Brown creeper, Certhia americana

== Gnatcatchers ==
Order: Passeriformes Family: Polioptilidae

Gnatcatchers are a group of small insectivorous passerine birds. Most are of generally undistinguished appearance, but many have distinctive songs.

- Blue-grey gnatcatcher, Polioptila caerulea (S)

== Wrens ==
Order: Passeriformes Family: Troglodytidae

Wrens are small and inconspicuous birds, except for their loud songs. They have short wings and thin down-turned bills. Several species often hold their tails upright. All are insectivorous.

- Rock wren, Salpinctes obsoletus
- Canyon wren, Catherpes mexicanus (H)
- House wren, Troglodytes aedon
- Pacific wren, Troglodytes pacificus (S)
- Winter wren, Troglodytes hiemalis
- Sedge wren, Cistothorus platensis
- Marsh wren, Cistothorus palustris
- Carolina wren, Thryothorus ludovicianus (H)
- Cactus wren, Campylorhynchus brunneicapillus (H)

== Mockingbirds and thrashers ==
Order: Passeriformes Family: Mimidae

The mimids are a family of passerine birds that includes thrashers, mockingbirds, tremblers, and the New World catbirds. These birds are notable for their vocalization, especially their remarkable ability to mimic a wide variety of birds and other sounds heard outdoors. The species tend towards dull greys and browns in their appearance.

- Grey catbird, Dumetella carolinensis
- Curve-billed thrasher, Toxostoma curvirostre (S)
- Brown thrasher, Toxostoma rufum
- Bendire's thrasher, Toxostoma bendirei (H)
- Sage thrasher, Oreoscoptes montanus (S)
- Northern mockingbird, Mimus polyglottos

== Starlings ==
Order: Passeriformes Family: Sturnidae

Starlings are small to medium-sized passerine birds. Their flight is strong and direct and they are very gregarious. Their preferred habitat is fairly open country. They eat insects and fruit. Plumage is typically dark with a metallic sheen.

- European starling, Sturnus vulgaris (I)

== Dippers ==
Order: Passeriformes Family: Cinclidae

Dippers are a group of perching birds whose habitat includes aquatic environments in the Americas, Europe, and Asia. They are named for their bobbing or dipping movements. These birds have adaptations which allows them to submerge and walk on the bottom to feed on insect larvae.

- American dipper, Cinclus mexicanus (S)

== Thrushes and allies ==
Order: Passeriformes Family: Turdidae

The thrushes are a group of passerine birds that occur mainly in the Old World. They are plump, soft plumaged, small to medium-sized insectivores or sometimes omnivores, often feeding on the ground. Many have attractive songs.

- Eastern bluebird, Sialia sialis
- Western bluebird, Sialia mexicana (H)
- Mountain bluebird, Sialia currucoides
- Townsend's solitaire, Myadestes townsendi
- Veery, Catharus fuscescens
- Grey-cheeked thrush, Catharus minimus
- Swainson's thrush, Catharus ustulatus
- Hermit thrush, Catharus guttatus
- Wood thrush, Hylocichla mustelina (S)
- Fieldfare, Turdus pilaris (S)
- American robin, Turdus migratorius
- Varied thrush, Ixoreus naevius

== Old World flycatchers ==
Order: Passeriformes Family: Muscicapidae

The Old World flycatchers are a large family of small passerine birds. These are mainly small arboreal insectivores, many of which, as the name implies, take their prey on the wing.

- Northern wheatear, Oenanthe oenanthe (S)

== Silky-flycatchers ==
Order: Passeriformes Family: Ptiliogonatidae

The silky-flycatchers are a small family of passerine birds which occur mainly in Central America. They are related to waxwings and most species have small crests.

- Phainopepla, Phainopepla nitens (S)

== Old World sparrows ==
Order: Passeriformes Family: Passeridae

Old World sparrows are small passerine birds. In general, sparrows tend to be small plump brownish or greyish birds with short tails and short powerful beaks. Sparrows are seed-eaters, but they also consume small insects.

- House sparrow, Passer domesticus (I)
- Eurasian tree sparrow, Passer montanus (I) (H)

== Wagtails and pipits ==
Order: Passeriformes Family: Motacillidae

Motacillidae is a family of small passerine birds with medium to long tails. They include the wagtails, longclaws, and pipits. They are slender ground-feeding insectivores of open country.

- American pipit, Anthus rubescens
- Sprague's pipit, Anthus spragueii

== Finches, euphonias, and allies ==
Order: Passeriformes Family: Fringillidae

Finches are small to moderately large seed-eating passerine birds with a strong beak, usually conical and in some species very large. All have 12 tail feathers and nine primaries flight feathers. Finches have a bouncing flight, alternating bouts of flapping with gliding on closed wings, and most sing well.

- Brambling, Fringilla montifringilla (S)
- Evening grosbeak, Coccothraustes vespertinus
- Pine grosbeak, Pinicola enucleator
- Grey-crowned rosy-finch, Leucosticte tephrocotis
- Black rosy-finch, Leucosticte atrata (H)
- House finch, Haemorhous mexicanus (I) (Native to the southwestern U.S.)
- Purple finch, Haemorhous purpureus
- Cassin's finch, Haemorhous cassinii (S)
- Common redpoll, Acanthis flammea
- Hoary redpoll, Acanthis hornemanni
- Red crossbill, Loxia curvirostra
- White-winged crossbill, Loxia leucoptera
- Pine siskin, Spinus pinus
- Lesser goldfinch, Spinus psaltria (S)
- American goldfinch, Spinus tristis

== Longspurs and snow buntings ==
Order: Passeriformes Family: Calcariidae

The Calcariidae are a group of passerine birds that were traditionally grouped with the New World sparrows, but differ in a number of respects and are usually found in open grassy areas.

- Thick-billed longspur, Rhynchophanes mccownii
- Lapland longspur, Calcarius lapponicus
- Smith's longspur, Calcarius pictus
- Chestnut-collared longspur, Calcarius ornatus
- Snow bunting, Plectrophenax nivalis

== Old World buntings ==
Order: Passeriformes Family: Emberizidae

Emberizidae is a family of passerine birds containing a single genus. Until 2017, the New World sparrows (Passerellidae) were also considered part of this family.

- Rustic bunting, Emberiza rustica (S)

== New World sparrows ==
Order: Passeriformes Family: Passerellidae

Until 2017, these species were considered part of the family Emberizidae. Most of the species are known as sparrows, but these birds are not closely related to the Old World sparrows which are in the family Passeridae. Many of these have distinctive head patterns.

- Grasshopper sparrow, Ammodramus savannarum
- Black-throated sparrow, Amphispiza bilineata (S)
- Lark sparrow, Chondestes grammacus
- Lark bunting, Calamospiza melanocorys
- Chipping sparrow, Spizella passerina
- Clay-coloured sparrow, Spizella pallida
- Field sparrow, Spizella pusilla
- Brewer's sparrow, Spizella breweri
- Fox sparrow, Passerella iliaca
- American tree sparrow, Spizelloides arborea
- Dark-eyed junco, Junco hyemalis
- White-crowned sparrow, Zonotrichia leucophrys
- Golden-crowned sparrow, Zonotrichia atricapilla (S)
- Harris's sparrow, Zonotrichia querula
- White-throated sparrow, Zonotrichia albicollis
- Sagebrush sparrow, Artemisiospiza nevadensis (H)
- Vesper sparrow, Pooecetes gramineus
- LeConte's sparrow, Ammospiza leconteii
- Nelson's sparrow, Ammospiza nelsoni
- Baird's sparrow, Centronyx bairdii (A)
- Savannah sparrow, Passerculus sandwichensis
- Song sparrow, Melospiza melodia
- Lincoln's sparrow, Melospiza lincolnii
- Swamp sparrow, Melospiza georgiana
- Green-tailed towhee, Pipilo chlorurus (S)
- Spotted towhee, Pipilo maculatus
- Eastern towhee, Pipilo erythrophthalmus

== Yellow-breasted chat ==
Order: Passeriformes Family: Icteriidae

This species was historically placed in the wood-warblers (Parulidae) but nonetheless most authorities were unsure if it belonged there. It was placed in its own family in 2017.

- Yellow-breasted chat, Icteria virens

== Troupials and allies ==
Order: Passeriformes Family: Icteridae

The icterids are a group of small to medium-sized, often colourful passerine birds restricted to the New World and include the blackbirds, meadowlarks, cowbirds, grackles, and New World orioles. Most species have black as a predominant plumage colour, often enlivened by yellow, orange, or red.

- Yellow-headed blackbird, Xanthocephalus xanthocephalus
- Bobolink, Dolichonyx oryzivorus
- Eastern meadowlark, Sturnella magna (S)
- Western meadowlark, Sturnella neglecta
- Orchard oriole, Icterus spurius
- Bullock's oriole, Icterus bullockii (S)
- Baltimore oriole, Icterus galbula
- Red-winged blackbird, Agelaius phoeniceus
- Brown-headed cowbird, Molothrus ater
- Rusty blackbird, Euphagus carolinus
- Brewer's blackbird, Euphagus cyanocephalus
- Common grackle, Quiscalus quiscula
- Great-tailed grackle, Quiscalus mexicanus (H)

== New world warblers ==
Order: Passeriformes Family: Parulidae

The wood-warblers are a group of small often colourful passerine birds restricted to the New World. Most are arboreal, but some are more terrestrial. Most members of this family are insectivores.

- Ovenbird, Seiurus aurocapilla
- Worm-eating warbler, Helmitheros vermivorum (S)
- Northern waterthrush, Parkesia noveboracensis
- Golden-winged warbler, Vermivora chrysoptera (S)
- Blue-winged warbler, Vermivora cyanoptera (S)
- Black-and-white warbler, Mniotilta varia
- Prothonotary warbler, Protonotaria citrea (S)
- Tennessee warbler, Leiothlypis peregrina
- Orange-crowned warbler, Leiothlypis celata
- Nashville warbler, Leiothlypis ruficapilla
- Connecticut warbler, Oporornis agilis
- MacGillivray's warbler, Geothlypis tolmiei
- Mourning warbler, Geothlypis philadelphia
- Kentucky warbler, Geothlypis formosa (H)
- Common yellowthroat, Geothlypis trichas
- Hooded warbler, Setophaga citrina (S)
- American redstart, Setophaga ruticilla
- Cape May warbler, Setophaga tigrina
- Northern parula, Setophaga americana (S)
- Magnolia warbler, Setophaga magnolia
- Bay-breasted warbler, Setophaga castanea
- Blackburnian warbler, Setophaga fusca
- Yellow warbler, Setophaga petechia
- Chestnut-sided warbler, Setophaga pensylvanica
- Blackpoll warbler, Setophaga striata
- Black-throated blue warbler, Setophaga caerulescens
- Palm warbler, Setophaga palmarum
- Pine warbler, Setophaga pinus (S)
- Yellow-rumped warbler, Setophaga coronata
- Yellow-throated warbler, Setophaga dominica (S)
- Prairie warbler, Setophaga discolor (S)
- Black-throated grey warbler, Setophaga nigrescens (S)
- Townsend's warbler, Setophaga townsendi (S)
- Black-throated green warbler, Setophaga virens
- Canada warbler, Cardellina canadensis
- Wilson's warbler, Cardellina pusilla

== Cardinals and allies ==
Order: Passeriformes Family: Cardinalidae

Cardinals and grosbeaks are a family of robust, seed-eating birds with strong bills. They are typically associated with open woodland. The sexes usually have distinct plumages.

- Hepatic tanager, Piranga flava (S)
- Summer tanager, Piranga rubra (S)
- Scarlet tanager, Piranga olivacea
- Western tanager, Piranga ludoviciana
- Northern cardinal, Cardinalis cardinalis
- Rose-breasted grosbeak, Pheucticus ludovicianus
- Black-headed grosbeak, Pheucticus melanocephalus
- Blue grosbeak, Passerina caerulea (S)
- Lazuli bunting, Passerina amoena
- Indigo bunting, Passerina cyanea
- Painted bunting, Passerina ciris (S)
- Dickcissel, Spiza americana

== See also ==
- List of birds
- Lists of birds by region
- List of birds of Canada
