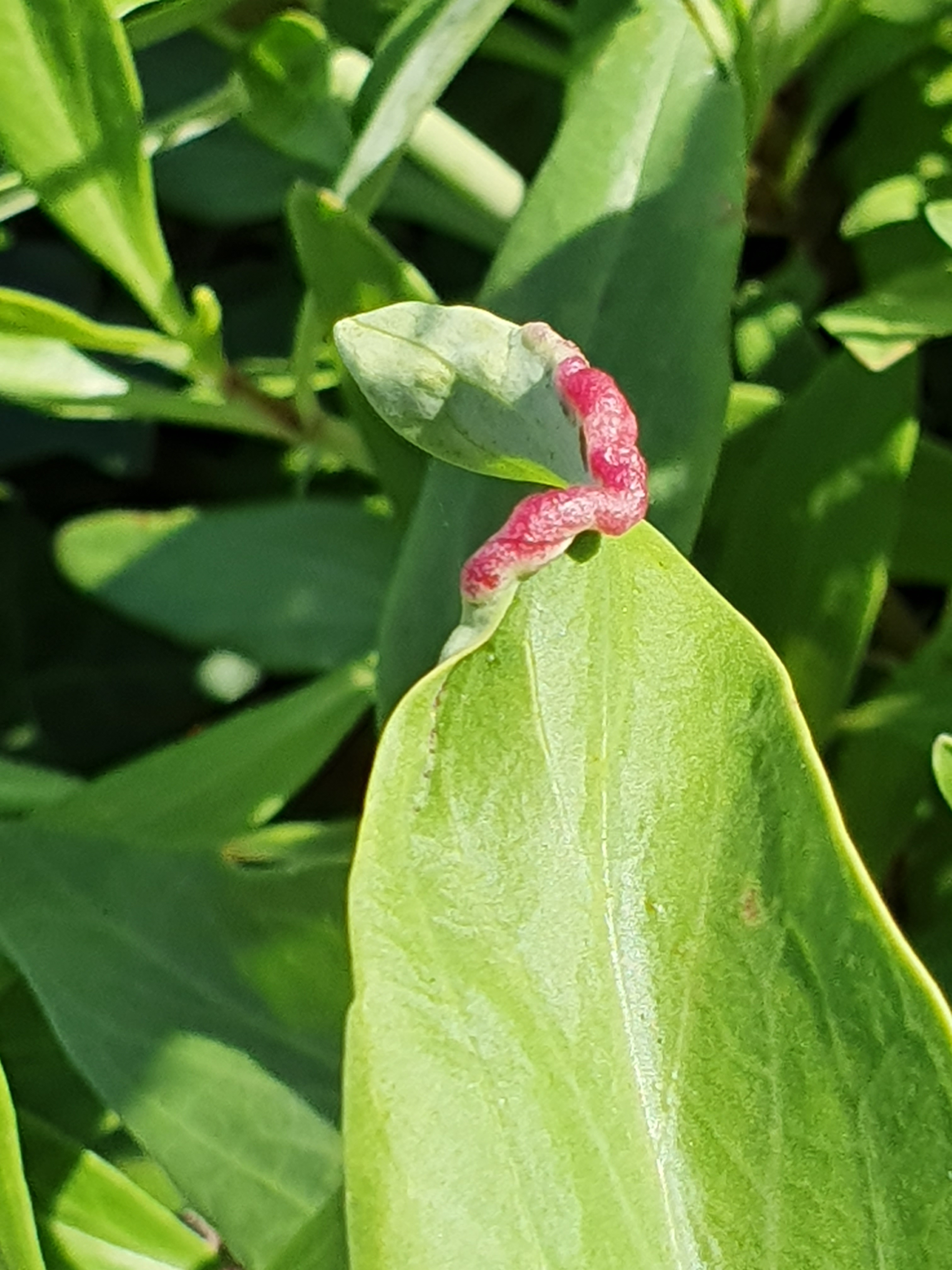
- Forming a gall on red valerian

Scientific classification
- Domain: Eukaryota
- Kingdom: Animalia
- Phylum: Arthropoda
- Class: Insecta
- Order: Hemiptera
- Suborder: Sternorrhyncha
- Family: Triozidae
- Genus: Trioza
- Species: T. centranthi

Binomial name
- Trioza centranthi (Vallot, 1829)

Synonyms
- Psylla centranthi Vallot, 1829

= Trioza centranthi =

Sap-sucking hemipteran bug

Trioza centranthi is a sap-sucking hemipteran bug in the family Triozidae which creates galls on the leaves and flowers of Centranthus and Valerianella species. It was first described by Jean Nicolas Vallot, a French entomologist in 1829 and is found in Europe.

== Description of the gall ==
The leaf at the tip of the shoot is broader than normal and the edges of the leaf are swollen and turned upwards. The flowers can also be affected and are a tangled leafy mass (phyllanthy). Plants galled include Centranthus angustifolius, C. calcitrapa, red valerian (C. ruber), Fedia cornucopiae, Valerianella carinata, V. coronata, V. dentata, common cornsalad (V. locusta) and V. rimosa.

== Distribution ==
Trioza centranthi is found in Europe from Great Britain and France in the west to Ukraine in the east.
