= Trioza fletcheri =

Scientific classification
- Domain: Eukaryota
- Kingdom: Animalia
- Phylum: Arthropoda
- Class: Insecta
- Order: Hemiptera
- Suborder: Sternorrhyncha
- Family: Triozidae
- Genus: Trioza
- Species: T. fletcheri

Binomial name
- Trioza fletcheri Crawford, 1912

Subspecies
- Trioza fletcheri minor

Species of true bug

Trioza fletcheri is a sap-sucking bug species in the genus Trioza from the Punjab Province of Pakistan.

This species is a host for the parasitoid wasp Aprostocetus niger.
