= Aacanthocnema burckhardti =

Scientific classification
- Kingdom: Animalia
- Phylum: Arthropoda
- Class: Insecta
- Order: Hemiptera
- Suborder: Sternorrhyncha
- Family: Triozidae
- Genus: Aacanthocnema
- Species: A. burckhardti

Binomial name
- Aacanthocnema burckhardti Taylor, 2011

Species of true bug

Aacanthocnema burckhardti is a species of jumping plant louse, first found as a sap-sucker on plants of the genus Allocasuarina in Australia. The species is characterised by exhibiting an elongate habitus; short Rs and short cubital forewing cells; ventral genal processes beneath the apical margin of its vertex; short antennae; and nymphs that are elongate and very sclerotised (scale-like). It lacks hinaria on its eighth antennal segment as well as sclerotised spurs on its hind tibia. Females of the species lack a posterior apical hook on their proctiger.

The species was first described by Gary S. Taylor in 2011, and is named after Daniel Burckhardt from the Naturhistorisches Museum, in Basel, who collected the type material.
