= Calinda muiscas =

Scientific classification
- Kingdom: Animalia
- Phylum: Arthropoda
- Clade: Pancrustacea
- Class: Insecta
- Order: Hemiptera
- Suborder: Sternorrhyncha
- Superfamily: Psylloidea
- Family: Triozidae
- Genus: Calinda
- Species: C. muiscas

Binomial name
- Calinda muiscas Olivares & Burckhardt, 1997

Species of true bug

Calinda muiscas is a species of jumping plant lice of the genus Calinda in the family of Triozidae. The species was first described in 1997 by Olivares and Burckhardt.

== Etymology and habitat ==
Although the species name is linked to the Muisca who inhabited the central highlands of Colombia, the holotype has been found near former Inca Emperor estate Ollantaytambo, Cusco, Peru.

== Description ==
An adult male specimen of Calinda muiscas has been described having a brownish-ochre head and thorax. The antennae are dark-brown and ochreous, legs, abdomen and genitalia are ochreous. The forewing is yellowish-transparent with ochreous veins. The louse as apical dilatation of aedeagus, elongate with distinct ventro-basal hook distant from shaft. The forewing is about 2 mm long. The host plant for the jumping plant louse is unknown.

== Bibliography ==
- Olivares, Tania S.; Burckhardt, Daniel (1997). Jumping plant-lice of the New World genus Calinda (Hemiptera:Psylloidea:Triozidae) (PDF). Geneva, Switzerland: Société Suisse de Zoologie. pp. 231–344. ISSN 0035-418X. Archived from the original (PDF) on 2016-05-05.
