= Acanthocasuarina muellerianae =

Scientific classification
- Domain: Eukaryota
- Kingdom: Animalia
- Phylum: Arthropoda
- Class: Insecta
- Order: Hemiptera
- Suborder: Sternorrhyncha
- Family: Triozidae
- Genus: Acanthocasuarina
- Species: A. muellerianae

Binomial name
- Acanthocasuarina muellerianae Taylor, 2011

Species of true bug

Acanthocasuarina muellerianae is a species of jumping plant lice, first found on plants of the genus Allocasuarina in Australia. The species is characterised by exhibiting an elongate habitus; short Rs and short cubital forewing cells; ventral genal processes beneath the apical margin of its vertex; short antennae; and nymphs that are elongate and very sclerotised (scale-like). It possesses rhinaria on its fourth, sixth, eighth and ninth antennal segments; the species' hind tibia has one outer and two inner spurs, while the female's proctiger carries an apical hook posteriorly.
