= Calinda (disambiguation) =

Calinda or Kalinda is a martial art and associated dance form of the Caribbean.

Calinda may also refer to:

== Music ==
- Calinda, a rhythmic style within the Bomba music of Puerto Rico
- "Calinda", a standard melody of Louisiana Creole music
- "Calinda", a single by Laurent Wolf
- La Calinda, a ballet composed by Héctor Campos-Parsi
- "La Calinda", an orchestral piece from the Florida Suite by Frederick Delius
- "The Calinda", a single by Bing Crosby

== Other ==
- Calinda (bug), a bug genus in the family Triozidae
- Calynda, a city of ancient Caria
- Al Calinda, a character in the 1977 musical Working
- Calinda, a character in the 1976 film Drum

== See also ==
- Calends
- Colindă, a traditional Christmas carol in Romania and Moldova
- Kalenda (disambiguation)
- Kalinda (disambiguation)
