= Trioza barrettae =

Conservation status
- Critically Endangered (IUCN 3.1)

Scientific classification
- Domain: Eukaryota
- Kingdom: Animalia
- Phylum: Arthropoda
- Class: Insecta
- Order: Hemiptera
- Suborder: Sternorrhyncha
- Family: Triozidae
- Genus: Trioza
- Species: T. barrettae

Binomial name
- Trioza barrettae Taylor & Moir, 2014

Sap-sucking hemipteran bug

Trioza barrettae is a sap-sucking bug species in the genus Trioza. The species is endemic to Western Australia.
