= Kalenda =

Kalenda (or Calenda) may refer to:

- Kalenda (martial art), or Calinda, a martial art and associated dance form of the Caribbean
- Kalenda (festival), an ancient pagan festival originated by Adam, according to Jewish rabbinic literature
- Calends, or Kalendae, Kalenda, Kalendas, the first days of the month in the ancient Roman calendar
- Kalenda Proclamation, or Kalenda, a Catholic liturgy preceding mass on Christmas Eve
- Koliada

== People ==
- Česlovas Kalenda, a Lithuanian philosopher
- Dmitri Kalenda, Estonian ice hockey player for Tallinna HK Stars
- Jean Kalenda, soccer player for Birmingham City F.C. Reserves and Academy
- Calenda (surname)

== See also ==
- Calinda (disambiguation)
- Kalinda (disambiguation)
- Calendar (disambiguation)
