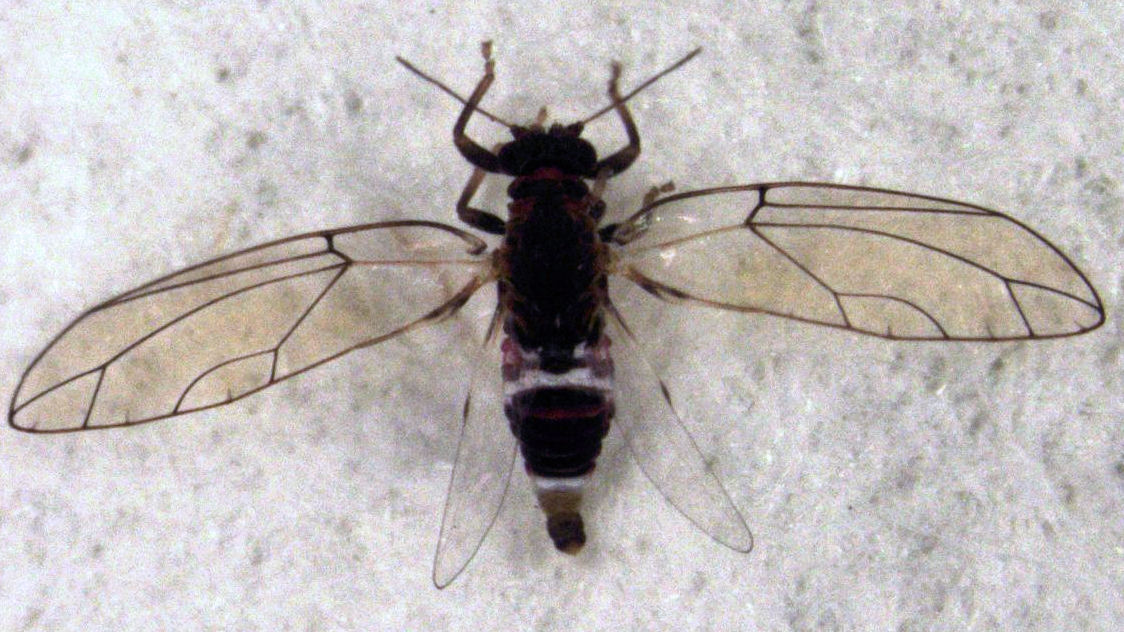
- T. adventicia, showing the trifurcation in wing veins

Scientific classification
- Kingdom: Animalia
- Phylum: Arthropoda
- Class: Insecta
- Order: Hemiptera
- Suborder: Sternorrhyncha
- Family: Triozidae
- Genus: Trioza; Förster, 1848

Synonyms
- Colopelma Enderlein, 1926; Powellia Maskell, 1879; Siphonaleyrodes Takahashi, 1932; Triozopsis Li, 2005

= Trioza =

Genus of true bugs

Trioza is the type genus of sap-sucking bugs in the family Triozidae; it has a world-wide distribution.

== Species ==
The Global Biodiversity Information Facility lists:

1. Trioza abdominalis Flor, 1861
2. Trioza achilleae Wagner, 1955
3. Trioza acuminata Tuthill, 1943
4. Trioza acuminatissima Liao, Huang & Yang, 2016
5. Trioza acuta (Ferris & Klyver, 1932)
6. Trioza adventicia Tuthill, 1952
7. Trioza agrophila Löw, 1888
8. Trioza aguacate Hollis & Martin, 1997
9. Trioza albifrons Crawford, 1910
10. Trioza alifumosa Klyver, 1932
11. Trioza alipellucida Klyver, 1932
12. Trioza alniphylli Fang & Yang, 1986
13. Trioza alseuosmiae Tuthill, 1952
14. Trioza amamiosimensis Kuwayama, 1943
15. Trioza analis Crawford, 1912
16. Trioza anamalaiensis Kandasamy, 1986
17. Trioza anceps Tuthill, 1944
18. Trioza anomalicornis Hollis, 1984
19. Trioza anthrisci Burckhardt, 1986
20. Trioza apartata Caldwell, 1944
21. Trioza apoensis Miyatake, 1972
22. Trioza apulica Rapisarda, 1994
23. Trioza arribensis Brown & Hodkinson, 1988
24. Trioza astraea Bliven, 1960
25. Trioza ata Hollis, 1984
26. Trioza atriplicina Loginova, 1964
27. Trioza auratilaterlis Li, 1995
28. Trioza australis Tuthill, 1952
29. Trioza aylmeriae Patch, 1912
30. Trioza baccharis Kieffer & Herbst, 1911
31. Trioza baeoiconica (Li, 2011)
32. Trioza bakeri Crawford, 1910
33. Trioza bamendae Hollis, 1984
34. Trioza banksiae Froggatt, 1901
35. Trioza barrettae Taylor & Moir, 2014
36. Trioza baruensis Brown & Hodkinson, 1988
37. Trioza beameri Tuthill, 1939
38. Trioza beesoni (Laing, 1930)
39. Trioza beilschmiediae Yang, 1984
40. Trioza bella Tuthill, 1944
41. Trioza berbericola Loginova, 1966
42. Trioza berberidis Burckhardt, 1988
43. Trioza berchemiae (Li, 2011)
44. Trioza berchemimaculus (Li, 2011)
45. Trioza bifasciaticeltis Li & Yang, 1991
46. Trioza bifida (Ferris & Klyver, 1932)
47. Trioza bimaculata Tuthill, 1942
48. Trioza blancardi Burckhardt, 1988
49. Trioza brachyceraea Hodkinson & White, 1979
50. Trioza breviantennata Crawford, 1914
51. Trioza brevianus Li, 2011
52. Trioza breviata Kwon & Lee, 1981
53. Trioza brevifrons Kuwayama, 1910
54. Trioza brevigenae Mathur, 1973
55. Trioza bullatae Burckhardt, Drohojowska & Giliomee, 2012
56. Trioza bussei Zacher, 1915
57. Trioza buxtoni Laing, 1924
58. Trioza caesaris Burckhardt & Lauterer, 2002
59. Trioza caii Li, 2006
60. Trioza caldwelli (Tuthill, 1944)
61. Trioza camerounensis Hollis, 1984
62. Trioza camphorae Sasaki, 1910
63. Trioza camphoricola Li, 1993
64. Trioza capeneri Hollis, 1984
65. Trioza carpathica Dobreanu & Manolache, 1959
66. Trioza carvalhoi Hollis, 1984
67. Trioza caseariae Yang, 1984
68. Trioza catlingi Hollis, 1984
69. Trioza celastrae Li, 1994
70. Trioza celtisae Yang, 1984
71. Trioza centranthi (Vallot 1829)
72. Trioza cerastii (Linnaeus, 1758)
73. Trioza chiangae Hollis, 1984
74. Trioza chilensis Šulc, 1914
75. Trioza chilgia Park & Lee, 1980
76. Trioza chiriquensis Brown & Hodkinson, 1988
77. Trioza chlora Tuthill, 1938
78. Trioza chrysanthemi Löw, 1878
79. Trioza cinnamomi (Boselli, 1930)
80. Trioza circularis Li, 1993
81. Trioza cirsii Löw, 1881
82. Trioza citroimpura Yang & Li, 1984
83. Trioza cochleatus (Li, 2011)
84. Trioza cochleipennis Burckhardt, 1988
85. Trioza cocquempoti Burckhardt & Lauterer, 2006
86. Trioza coelolomus Li, 2011
87. Trioza colorata (Ferris & Klyver, 1932)
88. Trioza comae Matsumoto, 1999
89. Trioza compressa Tuthill, 1952
90. Trioza confragosus (Li, 2011)
91. Trioza conicigenitus (Li, 2004)
92. Trioza coniconicus Li, 2011
93. Trioza crinita Tuthill, 1952
94. Trioza curta (Ferris & Klyver, 1932)
95. Trioza dacrydii Tuthill, 1952
96. Trioza dampfi Tuthill, 1944
97. Trioza decurvata (Ferris & Klyver, 1932)
98. Trioza dendroseridis Burckhardt, 1988
99. Trioza dentata Brown & Hodkinson, 1988
100. Trioza dentiforceps Dumbleton, 1966
101. Trioza dentigenitus (Li, 2011)
102. Trioza dinaba Hollis, 1984
103. Trioza discariae Tuthill, 1952
104. Trioza disjuncta Tuthill, 1951
105. Trioza dispar Löw, 1878
106. Trioza dissecticapita (Li, 2011)
107. Trioza dolichoconicus Li, 2011
108. Trioza doryphora (Maskell, 1880)
109. Trioza drosopouli Burckhardt & Lauterer, 2006
110. Trioza eafra Hollis, 1984
111. Trioza elaeagni Scott, 1880
112. Trioza elaeocarpi Yang, 1984
113. Trioza emarginata (Ferris & Klyver, 1932)
114. Trioza epiphitatae Caldwell, 1944
115. Trioza equalis (Ferris & Klyver, 1932)
116. Trioza erythrina Li & Yang, 1984
117. Trioza erytreae (Del Guercio, 1918)
118. Trioza esakii Miyatake, 1975
119. Trioza escurialensis Ramirez Gomez, 1960
120. Trioza etiennei Hollis, 1984
121. Trioza eugeniae Froggatt, 1901
122. Trioza eugenioides Crawford, 1917
123. Trioza euphobiae Shinji, 1942
124. Trioza euryae Yang, 1984
125. Trioza exoterica Yang, 1984
126. Trioza falcata (Ferris & Klyver, 1932)
127. Trioza fasciata (Ferris & Klyver, 1932)
128. Trioza fausta Fang, 1990
129. Trioza fernandesi Aguiar, 2001
130. Trioza ferruginea (Mathur, 1975)
131. Trioza ficiola Hollis, 1984
132. Trioza fissa Burckhardt, 1988
133. Trioza flaticoncavus Li, 2011
134. Trioza flavida Tuthill, 1952
135. Trioza flavipennis Foerster, 1848
136. Trioza fletcheri Crawford, 1912
137. Trioza flixiana Burckhardt & Lauterer, 2002
138. Trioza foersteri Meyer-Dür, 1871
139. Trioza forcipula Patch, 1912
140. Trioza formosana Kuwayama, 1910
141. Trioza frangulae Li, 2011
142. Trioza frontalis Crawford, 1910
143. Trioza fulva Tuthill, 1943
144. Trioza fulvida (Mathur, 1975)
145. Trioza furcellatus (Li, 2011)
146. Trioza fusca Mathur, 1975
147. Trioza fuscivena Hollis, 1984
148. Trioza galii Foerster, 1848
149. Trioza ghanaensis Hollis, 1984
150. Trioza glabea Hollis, 1984
151. Trioza godoyae Hollis & Martin, 1997
152. Trioza gourlayi Tuthill, 1952
153. Trioza graciliconis Brown & Hodkinson, 1988
154. Trioza grallata Percy, 2016
155. Trioza grandipennis Tuthill, 1944
156. Trioza gregoryi Hollis, 1984
157. Trioza guama Caldwell, 1942
158. Trioza guiera Hollis, 1984
159. Trioza hamicaulus (Li, 2011)
160. Trioza hargreavesi Hollis, 1984
161. Trioza harteni Hollis, 1984
162. Trioza hastata Burckhardt, 1988
163. Trioza hebicola Tuthill, 1952
164. Trioza henananus (Li, 2011)
165. Trioza heptaphleuruma Lahiri & Biswas, 1990
166. Trioza hildagoensis Caldwell, 1944
167. Trioza himalayensis Mathur, 1973
168. Trioza hirsuta (Crawford, 1912)
169. Trioza hopeae Burckhardt & Vu, 2012
170. Trioza huai Li, 2011
171. Trioza huashanicus Li, 2011
172. Trioza hyalina Crawford, 1912
173. Trioza hypandriata Kandasamy, 1986
174. Trioza ileicicola (Li, 2011)
175. Trioza ileicisuga (Li, 2011)
176. Trioza ilicina (De Stefani Perez, 1901)
177. Trioza incidata Tuthill, 1945
178. Trioza incrustata Percy, 2016
179. Trioza indica (Kandasamy, 1986)
180. Trioza indigena Tuthill, 1951
181. Trioza inequalis Brown & Hodkinson, 1988
182. Trioza inlechsis Burckhardt, 1988
183. Trioza inoptata Fang & Yang, 1986
184. Trioza insula Crawford, 1920
185. Trioza interposita Becker-Migdisova, 1964
186. Trioza intrans Li, 2011
187. Trioza inversa Tuthill, 1939
188. Trioza irinae Gegechkori, 1990
189. Trioza irregularis (Ferris & Klyver, 1932)
190. Trioza jambolanae Crawford, 1917
191. Trioza jejuensis (Kwon & Kwon, 2020) Cho, Burckhardt & Lee, 2022
192. Trioza jiuzhaigoicus (Li, 2011)
193. Trioza jugongshanicus Li, 2011
194. Trioza kakamegae Hollis, 1984
195. Trioza kala Yana, Mveyo Ndankeu, Dzokou & Tamesse, 2017
196. Trioza kandasamyi Burckhardt, 2018
197. Trioza kantshavelii Gegechkori, 1977
198. Trioza karroo Hollis, 1984
199. Trioza kasachstanica Loginova, 1964
200. Trioza kasugaensis Miyatake, 1975
201. Trioza kentae Taylor, Jennings, Purcell & Austin, 2013
202. Trioza kiefferi Giard, 1902
203. Trioza kilimanjarica Hollis, 1984
204. Trioza kuwayamai Enderlein, 1914
205. Trioza laingi Hollis, 1984
206. Trioza lanhsuensis Yang, 1984
207. Trioza laqueus Kandasamy, 1986
208. Trioza laserpitii Burckhardt & Lauterer, 1982
209. Trioza latiforceps Tuthill, 1952
210. Trioza laurisilvae Hodkinson, 1990
211. Trioza lautereriella Burckhardt, 1986
212. Trioza liberta Loginova, 1968
213. Trioza lienhardi Burckhardt, 1981
214. Trioza lineata Yang, 1984
215. Trioza lischines Burckhardt, 1988
216. Trioza litseae Bordage, 1898
217. Trioza lobata Mathur, 1975
218. Trioza loletae Bliven, 1958
219. Trioza longicornis Crawford, 1910
220. Trioza longigenae Tuthill, 1945
221. Trioza longigenitus (Li, 2011)
222. Trioza longipennis (Blanchard, 1852)
223. Trioza lophophorus (Li, 2004)
224. Trioza luminiaterus Li, 2011
225. Trioza luteus Li, 2011
226. Trioza luvandata Hollis, 1984
227. Trioza luzonensis Crawford, 1917
228. Trioza lyoniae (Li, 2011)
229. Trioza lyra Tuthill, 1951
230. Trioza machilicola Miyatake, 1968
231. Trioza macrocellata Matsumoto, 1999
232. Trioza macromalloti Li & Yang, 1991
233. Trioza macrosiphonus Li, 2011
234. Trioza maculata (Yang, 1984)
235. Trioza magna Kuwayama, 1910
236. Trioza magnicamphorae Li, 1993
237. Trioza magnisetosa Loginova, 1964
238. Trioza magnoliae (Ashmead, 1881)
239. Trioza malleiprocerus (Li, 2011)
240. Trioza malloticola (Crawford, 1928)
241. Trioza marginepunctata Flor, 1861
242. Trioza maritima Tuthill, 1944
243. Trioza marrubii (Ramirez Gomez, 1960)
244. Trioza massonianus Li, 2011
245. Trioza mayicola Kwon & Lee, 1981
246. Trioza medleri Hollis, 1984
247. Trioza megacerca Burckhardt, 1983
248. Trioza melaleucae Au?
249. Trioza menispermicola Hollis, 1984
250. Trioza mesembrina Burckhardt, 1986
251. Trioza messaratina Hollis, 1984
252. Trioza messii Dzokou, Tamesse & Burckhardt, 2009
253. Trioza mexicana Crawford, 1911
254. Trioza mica Loginova, 1972
255. Trioza micromalloti Li & Yang, 1991
256. Trioza miltosoma (Blanchard, 1852)
257. Trioza minor Crawford, 1912
258. Trioza minuta (Mathur, 1975)
259. Trioza mira Tuthill, 1943
260. Trioza mirificornis Hollis, 1984
261. Trioza monri Burckhardt, 2018
262. Trioza monsalvei Burckhardt, 1988
263. Trioza montana Tuthill, 1959
264. Trioza montanetana Aguiar, 2001
265. Trioza munda Foerster, 1848
266. Trioza mutisiae Tuthill, 1964
267. Trioza myohyangi Klimaszewski, 1968
268. Trioza myresae Burckhardt & Halbert, 2020
269. Trioza nachingweae Hollis, 1984
270. Trioza nana Gegechkori, 1977
271. Trioza naria Kwon, Suh, An & Huh, 1996
272. Trioza neglecta Loginova, 1978
273. Trioza neoboutonia Hollis, 1984
274. Trioza neolitseacola Yang, 1984
275. Trioza neolitseae Miyatake, 1965
276. Trioza nestasimara Hollis, 1984
277. Trioza nicaraguensis Crawford, 1911
278. Trioza nichtawitzi Tuthill, 1959
279. Trioza nigericapita (Li, 2005)
280. Trioza nigra Kuwayama, 1910
281. Trioza nigranigrus Li, 2011
282. Trioza nigriantennata Kandasamy, 1986
283. Trioza nigricamphorae Li, 1993
284. Trioza nigriconus Tuthill, 1944
285. Trioza nigriscutum Tuthill, 1945
286. Trioza nilisches Burckhardt, 1988
287. Trioza nimro Burckhardt, 2018
288. Trioza nomei Brown & Hodkinson, 1988
289. Trioza novalata Brown & Hodkinson, 1988
290. Trioza obfusca (Ferris & Klyver, 1932)
291. Trioza obionae Loginova, 1964
292. Trioza obscura Tuthill, 1952
293. Trioza obtusa Patch, 1911
294. Trioza obunca Fang & Yang, 1986
295. Trioza ocoteae Houard, 1933
296. Trioza okinawae Matsumoto, 1999
297. Trioza oleariae Froggatt, 1903
298. Trioza outeiensis Yang, 1984
299. Trioza palaquii (Laing, 1930)
300. Trioza pallida (Uichanco, 1919)
301. Trioza panacis Maskell, 1890
302. Trioza papillata Crawford, 1920
303. Trioza parabeilschmiediae Yang, Burckhardt & Fang, 2013
304. Trioza parthenoxyli Yang & Li, 1984
305. Trioza parva (Kandasamy, 1986)
306. Trioza parvipennis Tuthill, 1952
307. Trioza pelorocephalus Li, 2011
308. Trioza penai Burckhardt & Olivares, 1995
309. Trioza percyae Taylor, Jennings, Purcell & Austin, 2013
310. Trioza perseae Tuthill, 1959
311. Trioza phaeospilus Li, 2011
312. Trioza phorodendrae Tuthill, 1939
313. Trioza pinicola (Crawford, 1914) Crawford, 1914
314. Trioza pitformis Mathur, 1975
315. Trioza pitkini Hollis, 1984
316. Trioza pittospori Aguiar, 2001
317. Trioza polylepidis Tuthill, 1959
318. Trioza propria Tuthill, 1951
319. Trioza proxima Flor, 1861
320. Trioza pseudocinnamomi Li, 1993
321. Trioza psyllihabitus Tuthill, 1945
322. Trioza qingchengshananus (Li, 2011)
323. Trioza quadrifasciata Miyatake, 1972
324. Trioza quadrimaculata Yang, 1984
325. Trioza quadripunctata Crawford, 1910
326. Trioza quercicola Shinji, 1944
327. Trioza remaudierei Burckhardt & Lauterer, 2002
328. Trioza remota Foerster, 1848
329. Trioza renarsa Tuthill, 1959
330. Trioza resupina Li & Yang, 1984
331. Trioza rhabdoclada Li, 1990
332. Trioza rhamni (Schrank, 1801)
333. Trioza rhamnisuga Li, 1994
334. Trioza rhinosa Caldwell, 1944
335. Trioza robusta Tuthill, 1944
336. Trioza rotundata Flor, 1861
337. Trioza rugosata Tuthill, 1944
338. Trioza ruiliensis Li, 2011
339. Trioza rumicis Löw, 1880
340. Trioza russellae Tuthill, 1944
341. Trioza sabashvilii Gegechkori, 1977
342. Trioza salicis (Linnaeus, 1761)
343. Trioza samoansis Crawford, 1927
344. Trioza saxifragae Löw, 1888
345. Trioza schefflericola Tuthill, 1952
346. Trioza schimae Li & Yang, 1984
347. Trioza schrankii Flor, 1861
348. Trioza schroederi Hollis, 1984
349. Trioza scobina Tuthill, 1952
350. Trioza scottii Löw, 1880
351. Trioza sembla Caldwell, 1940
352. Trioza senda Tuthill, 1959
353. Trioza senecionis (Scopoli, 1763)
354. Trioza seranistama Hollis, 1984
355. Trioza serrata Brown & Hodkinson, 1988
356. Trioza serrata Mathur, 1975
357. Trioza setifera Matsumoto, 1999
358. Trioza significans Tuthill, 1956
359. Trioza silvatica Tuthill, 1959
360. Trioza similis Becker-Migdisova, 1964
361. Trioza similis Heslop-Harrison, 1961
362. Trioza simplifica Mathur, 1975
363. Trioza sinuatus Li, 2011
364. Trioza sinuosa Tuthill, 1944
365. Trioza sola Fang & Yang, 1986
366. Trioza soniae Rapisarda, 1994
367. Trioza sozanica (Boselli, 1930)
368. Trioza spinulata Mathur, 1975
369. Trioza stackelbergi Loginova, 1967
370. Trioza steinbachi Burckhardt, 1988
371. Trioza striacauda Burckhardt, 1988
372. Trioza stroma Caldwell, 1944
373. Trioza struthanthi Burckhardt, Díaz & Queiroz, 2017
374. Trioza stygma Tuthill, 1939
375. Trioza styligera (Ferris & Klyver, 1932)
376. Trioza suavis Tuthill, 1951
377. Trioza subacuta (Ferris & Klyver, 1932)
378. Trioza subberbericola Loginova, 1974
379. Trioza subnigra Kandasamy, 1986
380. Trioza subproximata Becker-Migdisova, 1964
381. Trioza subvexa Tuthill, 1952
382. Trioza sulcata Crawford, 1910
383. Trioza sympauropsylloides (Miyatake, 1972)
384. Trioza syzygii Li & Yang, 1911
385. Trioza tabebuiae Santana & Burckhardt, 2001
386. Trioza tabulaeformis Li, 2011
387. Trioza taenianus Li, 2011
388. Trioza taeniatus (Li, 2011)
389. Trioza taiwanica Boselli, 1930
390. Trioza tamaninii (Conci, 1992)
391. Trioza tatrensis Klimaszewski, 1965
392. Trioza tavandula Hollis, 1984
393. Trioza tenuicona Crawford, 1919
394. Trioza tenuis Hollis, 1984
395. Trioza tergobscura Burckhardt, 1988
396. Trioza tericeps Tuthill, 1943
397. Trioza theroni Hollis, 1984
398. Trioza thibae Hollis, 1984
399. Trioza thoracica Caldwell, 1941
400. Trioza tibialis Kandasamy, 1986
401. Trioza tigris Li, 2011
402. Trioza tiliacora Hollis, 1984
403. Trioza tongshanicus (Li, 2011)
404. Trioza tracholomus Li, 2011
405. Trioza tricornuta Taylor, Jennings, Purcell & Austin, 2013
406. Trioza triozipennis (Crawford, 1919)
407. Trioza tripodanthi Burckhardt, Díaz & Queiroz, 2017
408. Trioza tripteridis Burckhardt, Conci, Lauterer & Tamanini, 1991
409. Trioza triqueter (Li, 2011)
410. Trioza tristaniae Froggatt, 1903
411. Trioza tristericis Burckhardt, Díaz & Queiroz, 2017
412. Trioza tundavalae Hollis, 1984
413. Trioza turouguei Tung, Liao, Burckhardt & Yang, 2020
414. Trioza ukogi Shinji, 1940
415. Trioza ulei (Rübsaamen, 1908)
416. Trioza umalii (Miyatake, 1972)
417. Trioza uniqua (Caldwell, 1940)
418. Trioza urracai Brown & Hodkinson, 1988
419. Trioza urtica (Linnaeus, 1758)
420. Trioza urticae (Linnaeus, 1758)
421. Trioza urticicola Li, 2011
422. Trioza usambarica Hollis, 1984
423. Trioza usubai Matsumoto, 1996
424. Trioza vagata Burckhardt, Díaz & Queiroz, 2017
425. Trioza valerianae Gegechkori, 1975
426. Trioza valida Yang, 1984
427. Trioza vanuae Kirkaldy, 1907
428. Trioza velutina Foerster, 1848
429. Trioza viridis Crawford, 1910
430. Trioza viridula (Zetterstedt, 1828)
431. Trioza vitiensis Kirkaldy, 1907
432. Trioza xiaochuni Li, 2011
433. Trioza xylopia Hollis, 1984
434. Trioza zagoda Caldwell, 1944
435. Trioza zayuensis Li, 1995
436. Trioza zhongtiaoshanicus (Li, 2011)
437. Trioza zimmermani Tuthill, 1942

=== Former species ===
- Trioza albiventris (Förster, 1848) was transferred to Bactericera albiventris.
- Trioza tasmaniensis (Froggatt, 1903) was transferred to Schedotrioza tasmaniensis.
