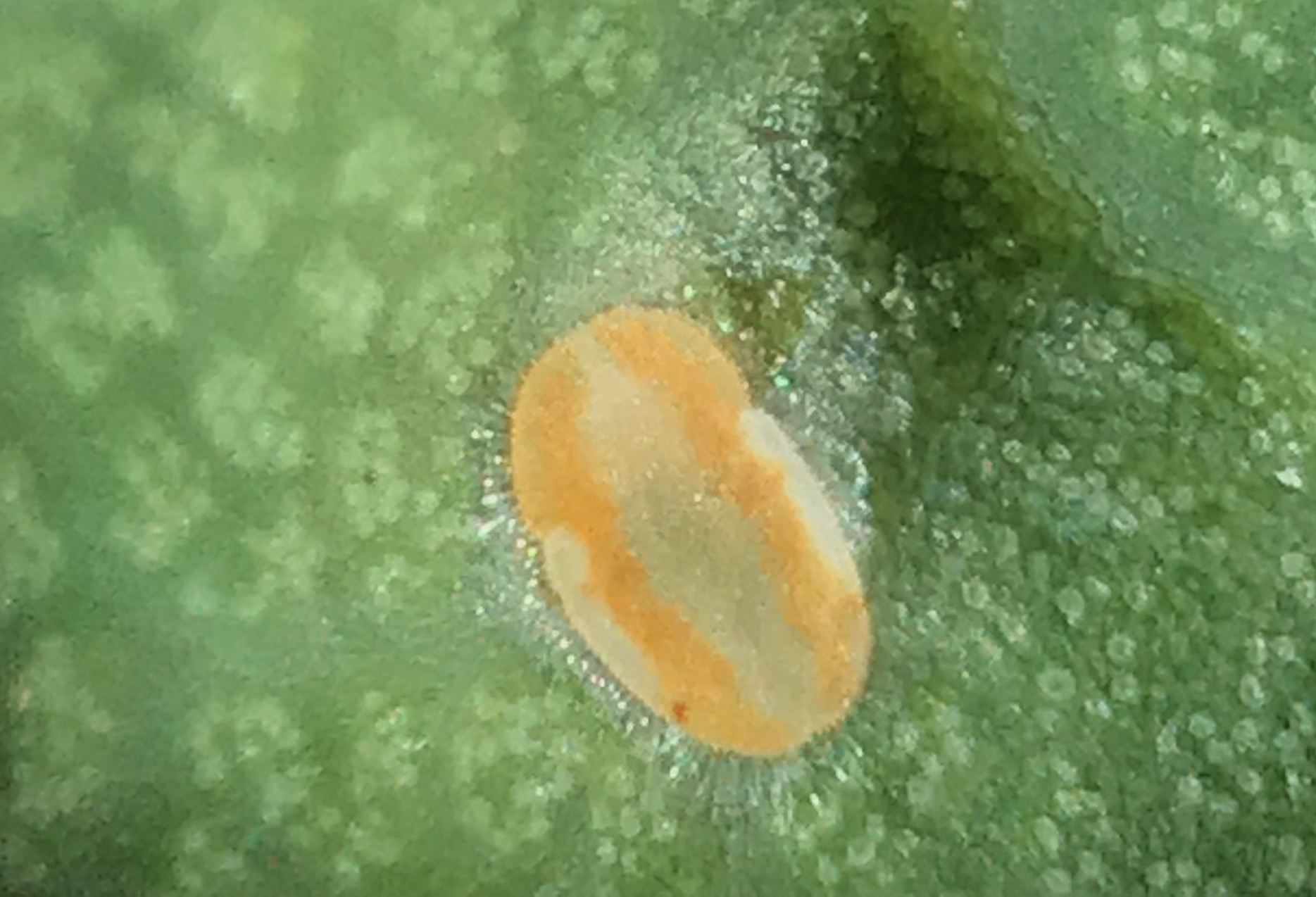
- Larval stage

Scientific classification
- Domain: Eukaryota
- Kingdom: Animalia
- Phylum: Arthropoda
- Class: Insecta
- Order: Hemiptera
- Suborder: Sternorrhyncha
- Family: Triozidae
- Genus: Trioza
- Species: T. remota

Binomial name
- Trioza remota Foerster, 1848

Synonyms
- Psylla marginata Hartig, 1841; Psylla simplex Hartig, 1841

= Trioza remota =

Sap-sucking hemipteran bug

Trioza remota is a sap-sucking hemipteran bug in the family Triozidae which creates galls on the leaves of oak (Quercus species).
