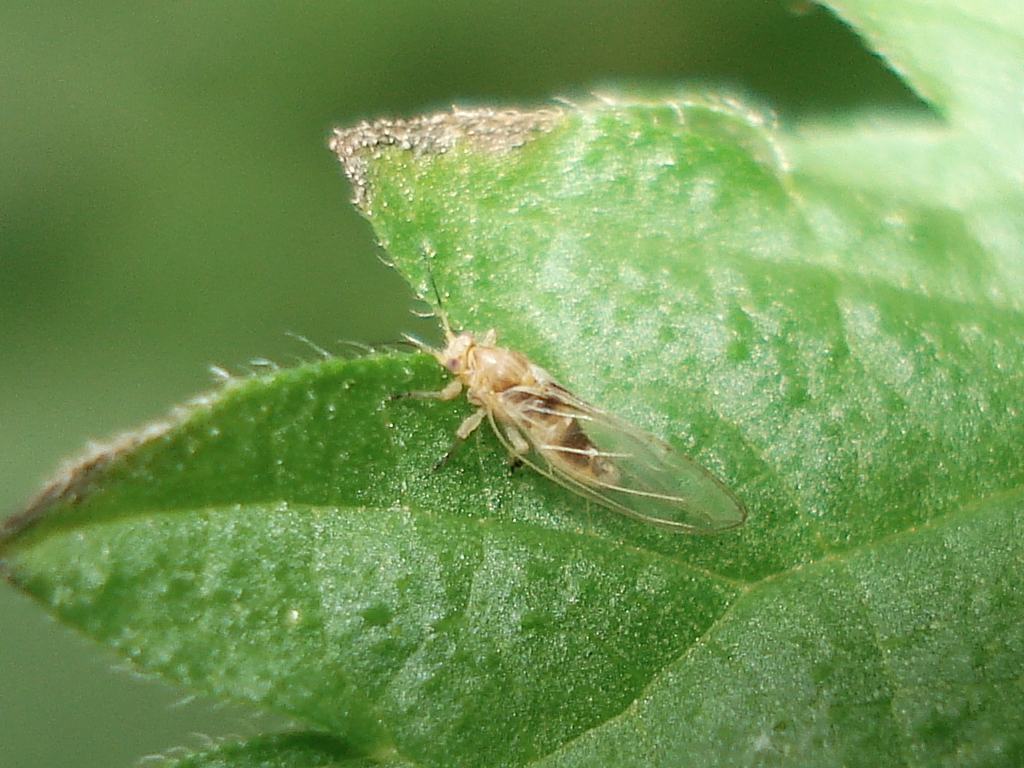

Scientific classification
- Kingdom: Animalia
- Phylum: Arthropoda
- Clade: Pancrustacea
- Class: Insecta
- Order: Hemiptera
- Suborder: Sternorrhyncha
- Family: Triozidae
- Genus: Trioza
- Species: T. urticae

Binomial name
- Trioza urticae (Linnaeus, 1758)

Synonyms
- Chermes urticae Linnaeus, 1758

= Trioza urticae =

Sap-sucking hemipteran bug

Trioza urticae is a sap-sucking hemipteran bug in the family Triozidae which creates galls on the leaves of nettles (Urtica species). It was described by the Swedish biologist and physician, Carl Linnaeus in 1758.

== Description of the gall ==
Galls are most obvious in August and September, when young leaves at the top of a shoot, above the summer growth are hairy, crinkled and have depressions containing a flat psyllid nymph. Heavily infested leaves are stunted and much darker than the unaffected leaves. There are two or three generations a year and psyllid populations are at their peak in the autumn; hence when the galls are easily seen. The autumn generation overwinters in turf or evergreens.

Host plants include common nettle (Urtica dioica), small nettle (Urtica urens) and Urtica membranacea.

== Distribution ==
Found all over Europe.
