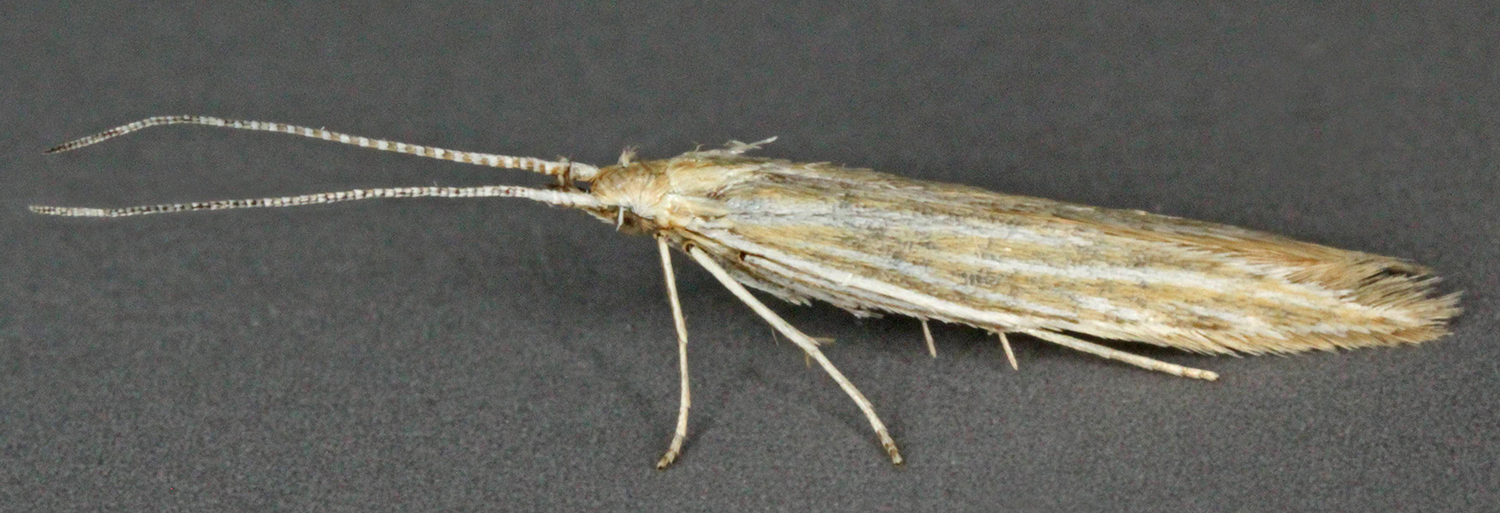

Scientific classification
- Kingdom: Animalia
- Phylum: Arthropoda
- Class: Insecta
- Order: Lepidoptera
- Family: Coleophoridae
- Genus: Coleophora
- Species: C. follicularis

Binomial name
- Coleophora follicularis (Vallot, [1802])

Synonyms
- Coleophora troglodytella Duponchel, [1843]; Coleophora inulifoliae Benander, 1936

= Coleophora follicularis =

Species of moth

Coleophora follicularis is a moth of the family Coleophoridae. The species was first described in 1802 by Jean Nicolas Vallot, a French entomologist. It is found in all of Europe. It is very similar to Coleophora trochilella and microscopic examination of the genitalia is required to separate the two.

Adults are on wing from June to August.

The larvae feed on Asteraceae species, including Achillea clavenae, Achillea millefolium, Achillea moschata, Anthemis, Carduus, Chrysanthemum leucanthemum, Cirsium arvense, Eupatorium cannabinum, Inula britannica, Inula conyza, Inula helenium, Pulicaria dysenterica and Tanacetum species. They create a slender tubular silken case of about 10 mm long. It is straw coloured and three valved. The mouth angle is about 30°.
