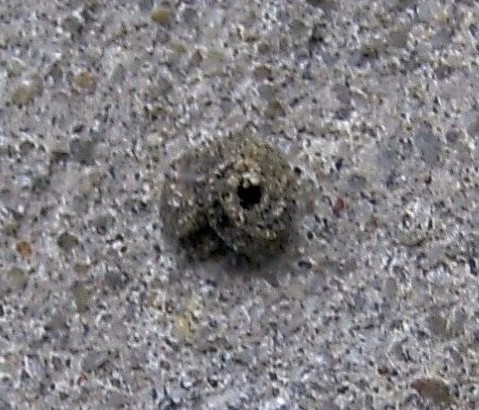
- Case

Scientific classification
- Kingdom: Animalia
- Phylum: Arthropoda
- Class: Insecta
- Order: Lepidoptera
- Family: Psychidae
- Genus: Apterona
- Species: A. helicoidella

Binomial name
- Apterona helicoidella (Vallot, 1827)

Synonyms
- Apterona helix (Siebold, 1850); Cochliotheca helicinella Rambur, 1866; Apterona crenulella (Bruand, 1853)

= Apterona helicoidella =

Snailcase bagworm

Species of moth

Apterona helicoidella (snailcase bagworm) is a moth of the Psychidae family. It is widely distributed in Europe, from Portugal through most of central Europe and the Alps up to the Ural. It is also found in the Balkan and Turkey. It was introduced in the United States by accident during the 1940s. It is now found throughout the Mid-Atlantic region, and has been reported on the U.S. West Coast, in Michigan, and in the western states.
