= Aacanthocnema torulosae =

Scientific classification
- Domain: Eukaryota
- Kingdom: Animalia
- Phylum: Arthropoda
- Class: Insecta
- Order: Hemiptera
- Suborder: Sternorrhyncha
- Family: Triozidae
- Genus: Aacanthocnema
- Species: A. torulosae

Binomial name
- Aacanthocnema torulosae Taylor, 2011

Species of true bug

Aacanthocnema torulosae is a species of jumping plant louse, first found on plants of the genus Allocasuarina in Australia. The species is characterised by exhibiting an elongate habitus; short Rs and short cubital forewing cells; ventral genal processes beneath the apical margin of its vertex; short antennae; and nymphs that are elongate and very sclerotised (scale-like). It lacks hinaria on its eighth antennal segment as well as sclerotised spurs on its hind tibia. Females of the species lack a posterior apical hook on their proctiger.
