= Torulus =

Scientific classification
- Domain: Eukaryota
- Kingdom: Animalia
- Phylum: Arthropoda
- Class: Insecta
- Order: Hemiptera
- Suborder: Sternorrhyncha
- Family: Triozidae
- Genus: Torulus; Li, 1991
- Species: T. sinicus

Binomial name
- Torulus sinicus Li, 1991

Genus of insects

Torulus is a genus of plant lice in the family Triozidae containing the single species Torulus sinicus Li, 1991, from the southern Himalayas.
