= Acanthocasuarina =

Scientific classification
- Domain: Eukaryota
- Kingdom: Animalia
- Phylum: Arthropoda
- Class: Insecta
- Order: Hemiptera
- Suborder: Sternorrhyncha
- Family: Triozidae
- Genus: Acanthocasuarina; Taylor, 2011

Genus of true bugs

Acanthocasuarina is a genus of bugs from the jumping plant lice family (Triozidae). The genus is endemic to Australia, and currently contains six species (Taylor et al., 2011).

== Species ==
- Acanthocasuarina acutivalvis Taylor, 2011
- Acanthocasuarina campestris Taylor, 2011
- Acanthocasuarina diminutae Taylor, 2011
- Acanthocasuarina muellerianae Taylor, 2011
- Acanthocasuarina tasmanica Taylor, 2011
- Acanthocasuarina verticillatae Taylor, 2011
