= Neotrioza =

Scientific classification
- Domain: Eukaryota
- Kingdom: Animalia
- Phylum: Arthropoda
- Class: Insecta
- Order: Hemiptera
- Suborder: Sternorrhyncha
- Family: Triozidae
- Genus: Neotrioza; Kieffer, 1905

Genus of insects

Neotrioza is a genus of East Asian plant lice belonging to the family Triozidae.

Species:

- Neotrioza machilae (Li, 1993)
- Neotrioza machili Kieffer, 1905
- Neotrioza shuiliensis (Yang, 1984)
