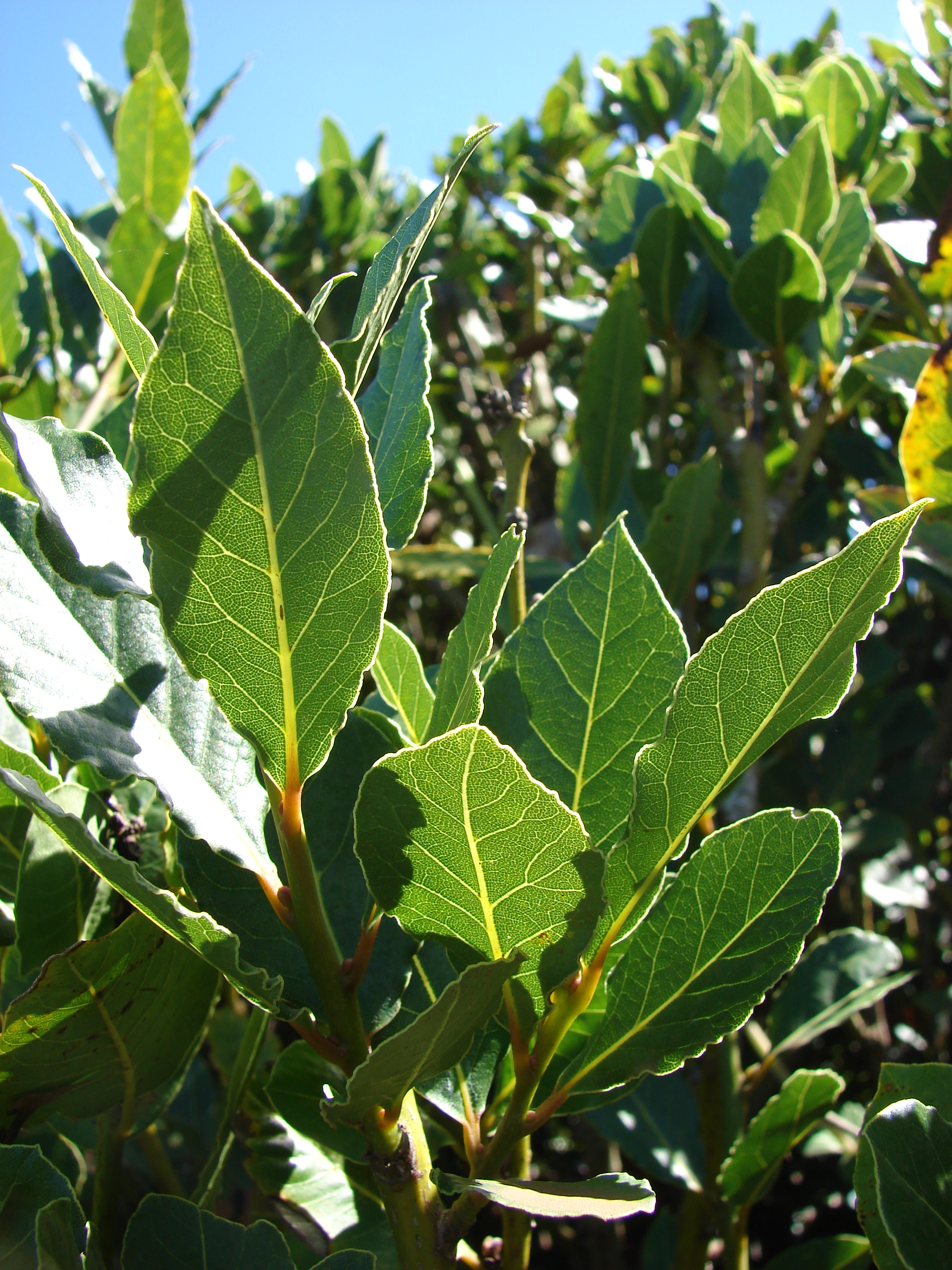
- Bay laurel (Laurus nobilis) leaves and branches

Conservation status
- Least Concern (IUCN 3.1)

Scientific classification
- Kingdom: Plantae
- Clade: Tracheophytes
- Clade: Angiosperms
- Clade: Magnoliids
- Order: Laurales
- Family: Lauraceae
- Genus: Laurus
- Species: L. nobilis

Binomial name
- Laurus nobilis L.
- Distribution map

= Laurus nobilis =

Species of flowering plant in the laurel family

Laurus nobilis (/ˈlɔːr.əs ˈnɒb.ɪl.ɪs/) is an aromatic evergreen tree or large shrub with green, glabrous (smooth) leaves. Common names include bay tree (especially in the United Kingdom), bay laurel, sweet bay, true laurel, Grecian laurel, or simply laurel.

It is in the flowering plant family Lauraceae. The stem can be 1 metre in diameter and the tree can be as high as 20 metres. Native to the Mediterranean region, Laurus nobilis figures prominently in classical Greco-Roman culture and served various medicinal, religious, and symbolic purposes. Bay leaves are widely used as seasoning in cooking.

Worldwide, many other kinds of plants in diverse families are also called "bay" or "laurel", generally due to similarity of foliage or aroma to Laurus nobilis.

== Description ==
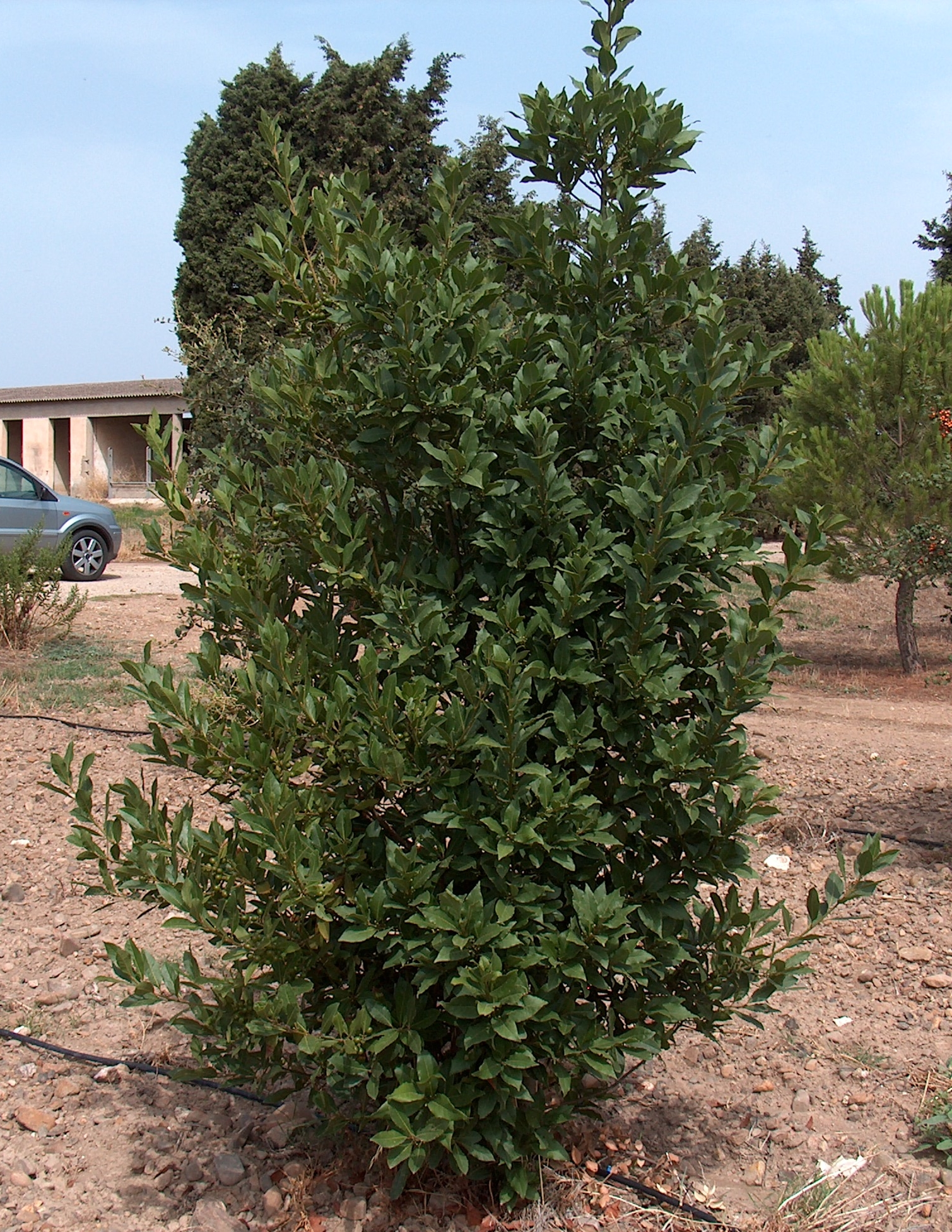
A laurel shrub

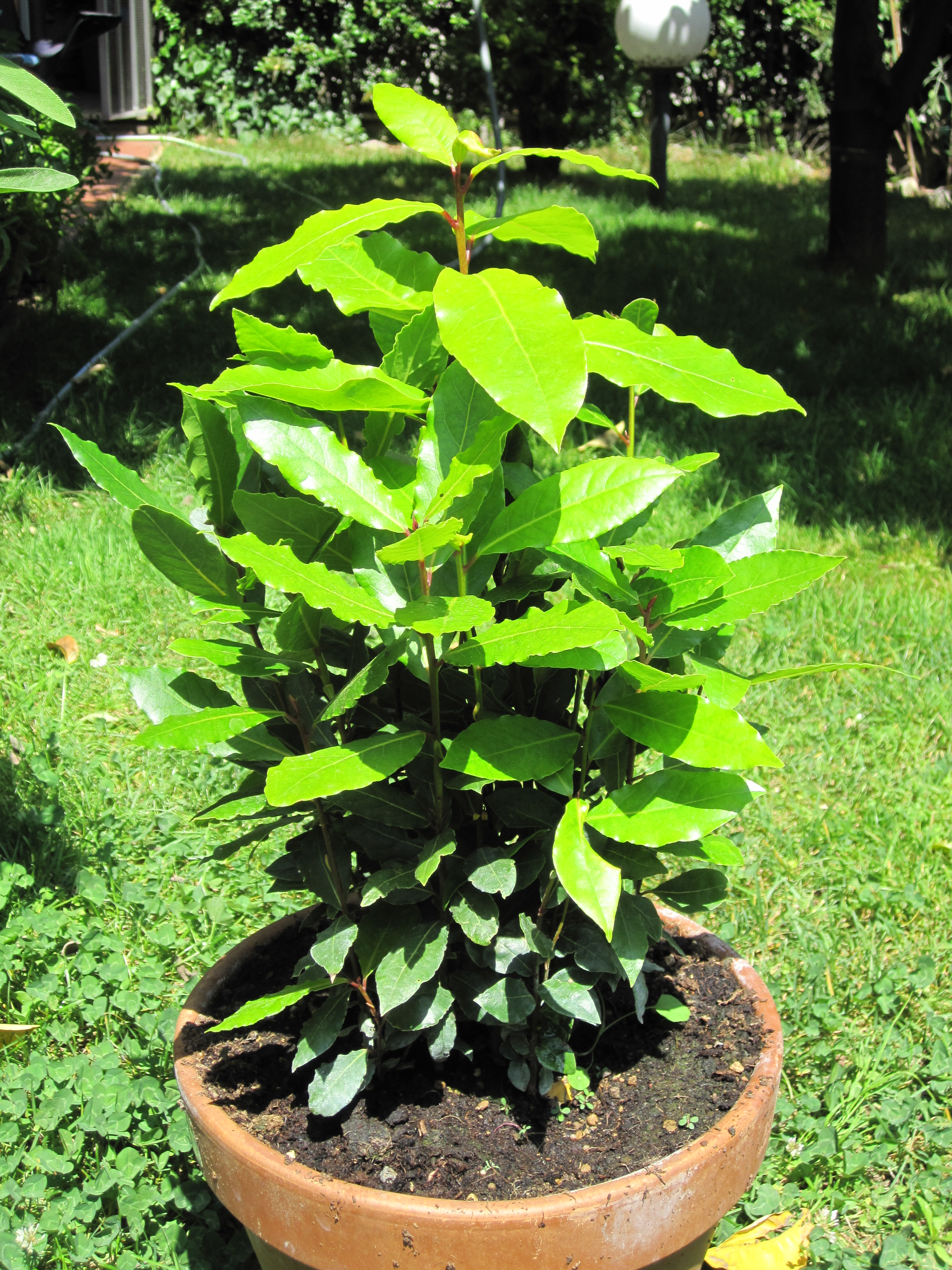
Laurus nobilis in pot

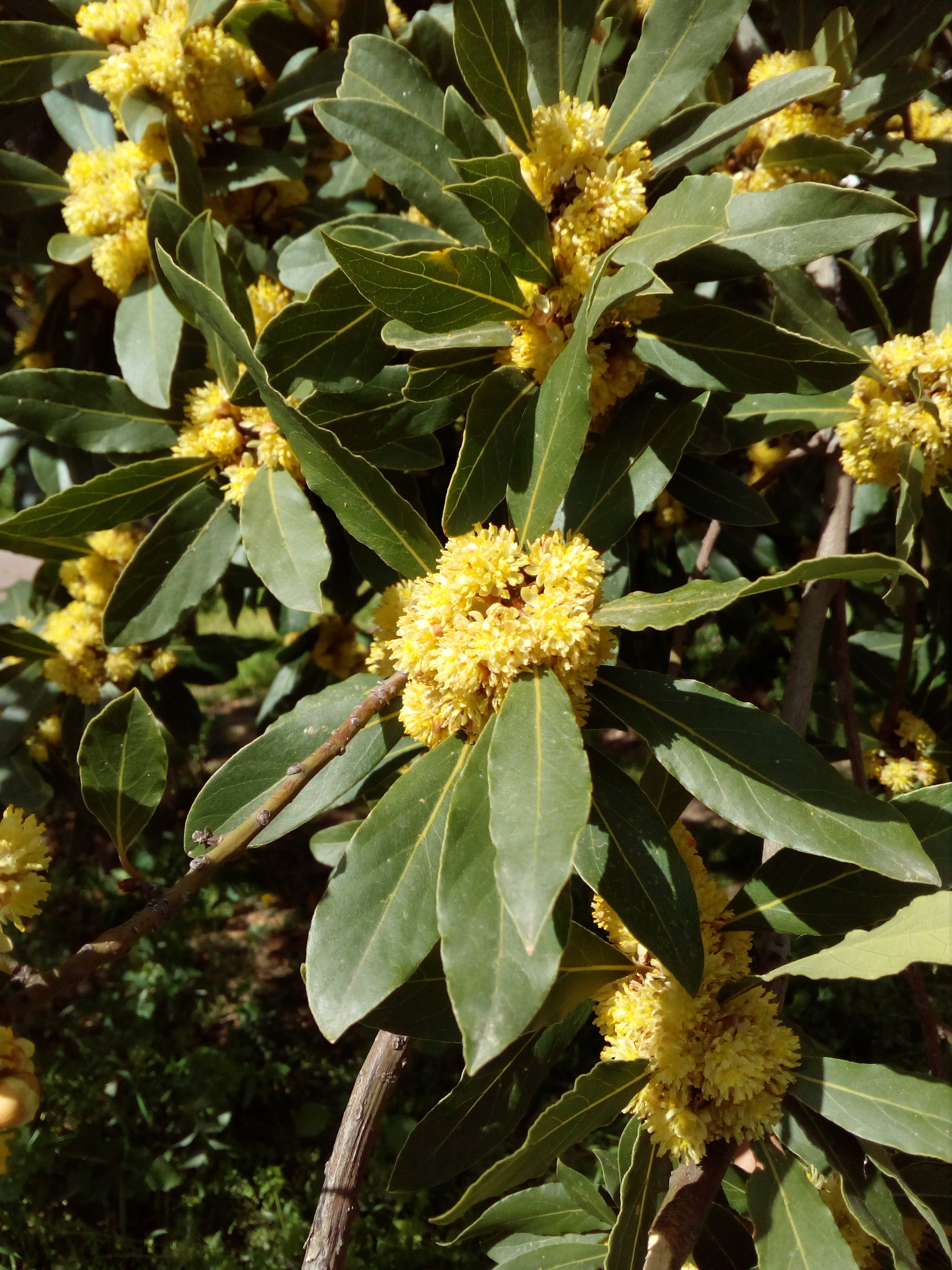
Laurus nobilis in bloom

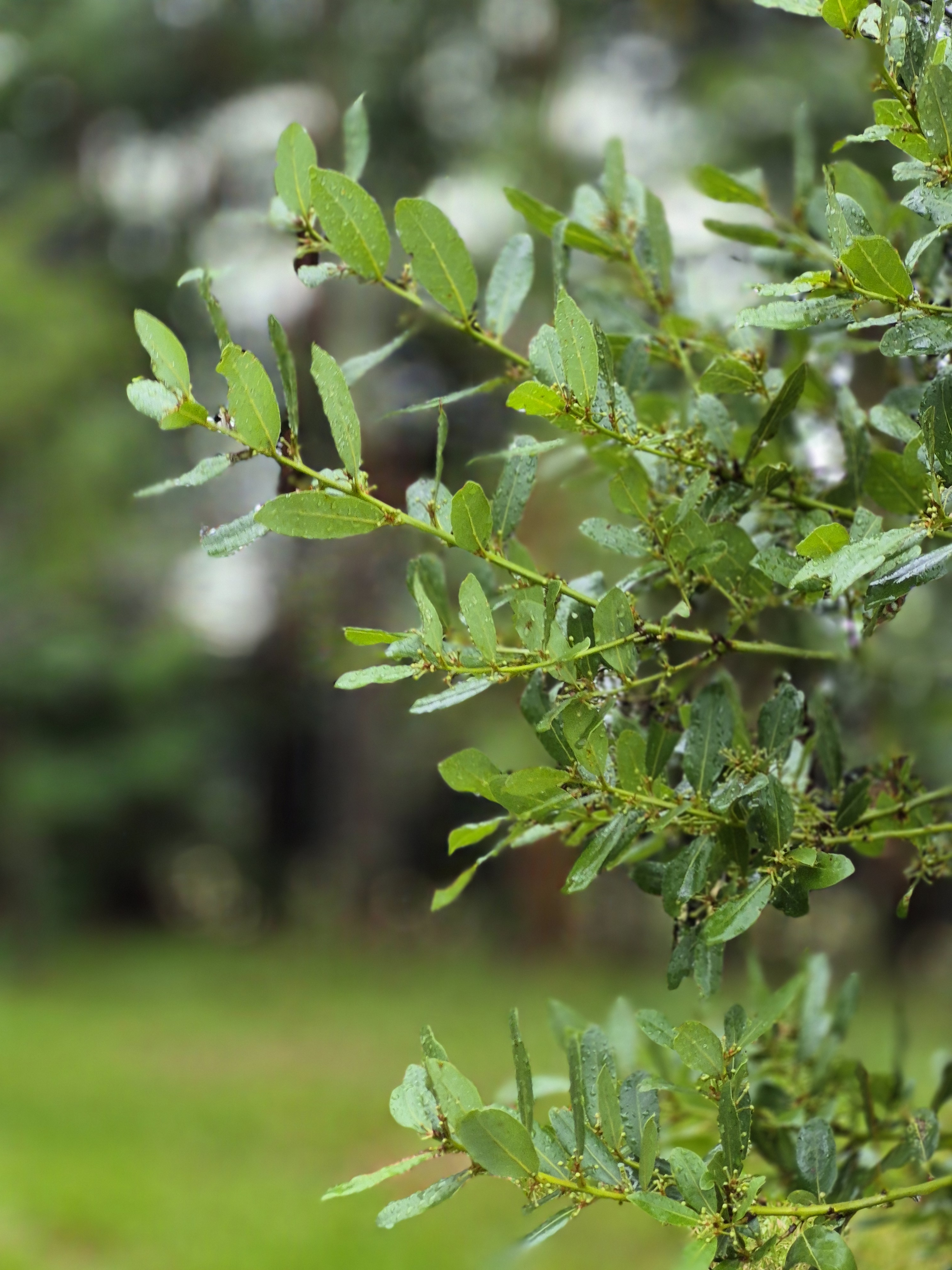
L. nobilis in Brazil

The laurel is an evergreen shrub or small tree, variable in size and sometimes reaching 7–18 m (23–59 ft) tall. The genus Laurus includes three accepted species, whose diagnostic key characters often overlap.

The bay laurel is dioecious (unisexual), with male and female flowers on separate plants. Each flower is pale yellow-green, about 1 cm (3/8 in) diameter, and they are borne in pairs beside a leaf. The leaves are glabrous, 6–12 cm (2–5 in) long and 2–4 cm (3/4–1 5/8 in) broad, with an entire (untoothed) margin. On some leaves the margin undulates. The fruit is a small, shiny black drupe-like berry about 1 cm (3/8 in) long that contains one seed.

== Ecology ==
Laurus nobilis is a widespread relict of the laurel forests that originally covered much of the Mediterranean Basin when the climate of the region was more humid. With the drying of the Mediterranean during the Pliocene era, the laurel forests gradually retreated, and were replaced by the more drought-tolerant sclerophyll plant communities familiar today. Most of the last remaining laurel forests around the Mediterranean are believed to have disappeared approximately ten thousand years ago, although some remnants still persist in the mountains of southern Turkey, northern Syria, southern Spain, north-central Portugal, northern Morocco, the Canary Islands and in Madeira.

== Human uses ==
=== History ===
Early evidence of the use of the plant has been found at Ashkelon in modern Israel, dating to 7th century BC Judea/Assyria.

=== Food ===
The plant is the source of several popular herbs and one spice used in a wide variety of recipes, particularly among Mediterranean cuisines. They are typically removed from dishes before serving, although they may also be used as a simple garnish. Whole bay leaves have a long shelf life of about one year, under normal temperature and humidity. Whole bay leaves are used almost exclusively as flavor agents during the food preparation stage. Ground bay leaves, however, can be ingested safely and are often used in soups and stocks, as well as being a common addition to a Bloody Mary. Dried laurel berries and pressed leaf oil can both be used as robust spices, and the wood can be burnt for strong smoke flavoring.

=== Ornamental ===
Laurus nobilis is widely cultivated as an ornamental plant in regions with Mediterranean or oceanic climates, and as a house plant or greenhouse plant in colder regions. It is used in topiary to create single erect stems with ball-shaped, box-shaped or twisted crowns; also for low hedges. However, it is slow-growing and may take several years to reach the desired height. Together with a gold form, L. nobilis 'Aurea' and a willow-leaved form L. nobilis f. angustifolia, it has gained the Royal Horticultural Society's Award of Garden Merit.

One of the most important pests affecting ornamental laurels is caused by the jumping plant louse Trioza alacris, which induces the curling and thickening of the edge of the leaves for the development of the insect's nymphs, eventually creating a necrosed gall. The species is also affected by the scale insect Coccus hesperidum.

=== Alternative medicine ===
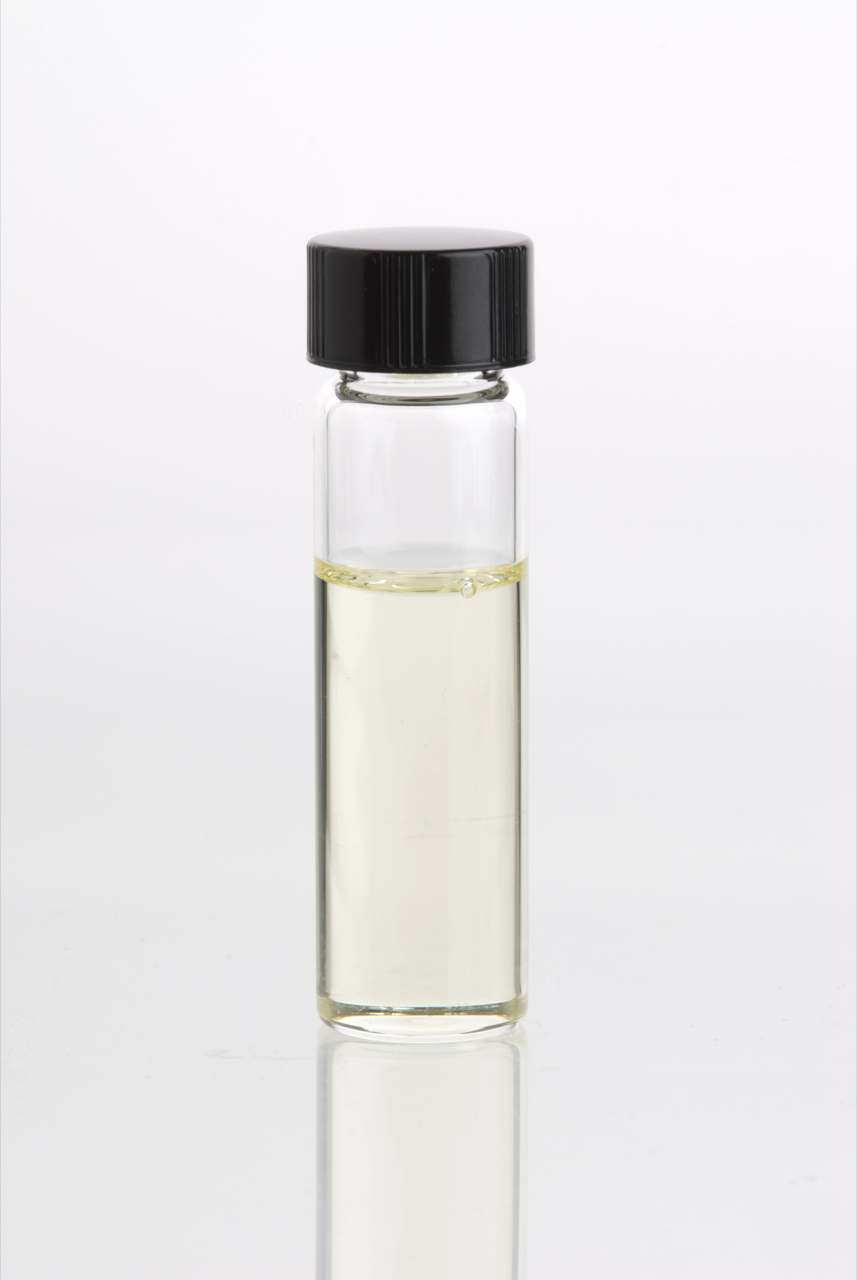
Laurus nobilis essential oil in clear glass vial

In herbal medicine, aqueous extracts of bay laurel have been used as an astringent and salve for open wounds. It is also used in massage therapy and aromatherapy. A folk remedy for rashes caused by poison ivy, poison oak, and stinging nettle is a poultice soaked in boiled bay leaves. The Roman naturalist Pliny the Elder listed a variety of conditions which laurel oil was supposed to treat: paralysis, spasms, sciatica, bruises, headaches, catarrhs, ear infections, and rheumatism.

== Symbolism ==
=== Greece ===
In Greek, the plant is called δάφνη (romanized dáphnē), and there is an etiological myth attaching the name to the mythic mountain nymph Daphne. In the myth, the god Apollo fell in love with Daphne, a priestess of Gaia (Mother Earth), and when he tried to seduce her she pleaded for help to Gaia, who transported her to Crete. In Daphne's place Gaia left a laurel tree, from which Apollo fashioned wreaths to console himself. Other versions of the myth, including that of the Roman poet Ovid, state that Daphne was transformed directly into a laurel tree.

In ancient Greece, laurel was used to fashion the laurel wreath, a symbol of highest status. A wreath of bay laurels was given as the prize at the Pythian Games because the games were in honor of Apollo, and the laurel was one of his symbols. According to the poet Lucian, the priestess of Apollo known as the Pythia reputedly chewed laurel leaves from a sacred tree growing inside the temple to induce the enthusiasmos (trance) from which she uttered the oracular prophecies for which she was famous. Some accounts starting in the fourth century BC describe her as shaking a laurel branch while delivering her prophecies. Those who received promising omens from the Pythia were crowned with laurel wreaths as a symbol of Apollo's favor.

The laurel was also associated with purification. Laurel branches and leaves were used in cleansing rituals, particularly in connection with sacred spaces and the cult of Apollo. At Delphi, laurel was burned as part of ritual practices, while its use also extended to the purification of homes. These practices contributed to the plant's longstanding association with spiritual cleansing and protection.

=== Rome ===
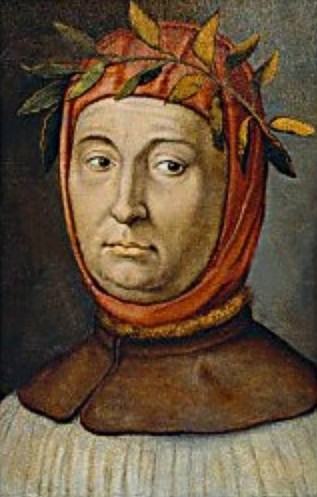
Petrarch, laurated poet, father of humanism

The symbolism carried over to Roman culture, which held the laurel as a symbol of victory. It was also associated with immortality, with ritual purification, prosperity and health. It is also the source of the words baccalaureate and poet laureate, as well as the expressions "assume the laurel" and "resting on one's laurels".

Pliny the Elder stated that the laurel was not permitted for "profane" uses – lighting it on fire at altars "for the propitiation of divinities" was strictly forbidden, because "it is very evident that the laurel protests against such usage by crackling as it does in the fire, thus, in a manner, giving expression to its abhorrence of such treatment".

Laurel was closely associated with the Roman Emperors, beginning with Augustus. Two Laurel trees flanked the entrance to Augustus' house on the Palatine Hill in Rome, which itself was connected to the Temple of Apollo Palatinus, which Augustus had built. Thus, the laurels had the dual purpose of advertising Augustus' victory in the Civil Wars and his close association with Apollo. Suetonius relates the story of Augustus' wife, and Rome's first Empress, Livia, who planted a sprig of laurel on the grounds of her villa at Prima Porta after an eagle dropped a hen with the sprig clutched in its beak onto her lap. The sprig grew into a full-size tree which fostered an entire grove of laurel trees, which were in turn added to by subsequent Emperors when they celebrated a triumph. The emperors in the Julio-Claudian dynasty all sourced their Laurel wreaths from the original tree planted by Livia. It was taken as an omen of the impending end of the Julio-Claudian dynasty that in the reign of Nero the entire grove died, shortly before he was assassinated. Rome's second Emperor Tiberius wore wreaths of laurel whenever there was stormy weather because it was widely believed that Laurel trees were immune to lightning strikes, affording protection to those who brandished it. One reason for this belief is because laurel crackles loudly when on fire. It led ancient Romans to believe the plant was inhabited by a "heavenly fire demon", and was therefore "immune" from outer threats like fire or lightning.

In modern Italy, laurel wreaths are worn as a crown by graduating school students.

=== East Asia ===
An early Chinese etiological myth for the phases of the moon involved a great forest or tree which quickly grew and lost its leaves and flowers every month. After the Sui and Tang dynasties, this was sometimes connected to a woodsman named Wu Gang, sentenced to cut at a self-repairing tree as a punishment for varying offenses. The tree was originally identified as a 桂 (guì) and described in the terms of the osmanthus (Osmanthus fragrans, now known in Chinese as the 桂花 or "gui flower"), whose blossoms are still used to flavor wine and confections for the Mid-Autumn Festival. However, in English, it is often associated with the more well-known cassia (Cinnamomum cassia, now known in Chinese as the 肉桂 or "meat gui") while, in modern Chinese, it has instead become associated with the Mediterranean laurel. By the Qing dynasty, the chengyu "pluck osmanthus in the Toad Palace" (蟾宫折桂, Chángōng zhé guì) meant passing the imperial examinations, which were held around the time of the lunar festival. The similar association in Europe of laurels with victory and success led to its translation into Chinese as the 月桂 or "Moon gui".

=== Finland ===
The laurel leaves in the right side of the coat of arms of Kaskinen

The laurel leaves in the coat of arms of Kaskinen, Finland (Swedish: Kaskö), may have been meant to refer to local flowering, but its origin may also be in the name of the family Bladh (Swedish: blad; 'leaf'); two members of the family – a father and a son – acquired both town rights and the status of staple town for the village at the time.

== Chemical constituents ==
The most abundant component found in laurel essential oil is 1,8-cineole, also called eucalyptol. The leaves contain about 1.3% essential oils (ol. lauri folii), consisting of 45% eucalyptol, 12% other terpenes, 8–12% terpinyl acetate, 3–4% sesquiterpenes, 3% methyleugenol, and other α- and β-pinenes, phellandrene, linalool, geraniol, and terpineol. It contains lauric acid also.

Both essential and fatty oils are present in the fruit. The fruit is pressed and water-extracted to obtain these products. The fruit contains up to 30% fatty oils and about 1% essential oils (terpenes, sesquiterpenes, alcohols, and ketones). This laurel oil is the characteristic ingredient of Aleppo soap. The chemical compound lauroside B has been isolated from Laurus nobilis.

== See also ==
- Laurel wreath
- Cherry laurel
- California bay laurel
- Mountain laurel
- Spotted laurel
- Redbay
