= Apterona =

Scientific classification
- Kingdom: Animalia
- Phylum: Arthropoda
- Clade: Pancrustacea
- Class: Insecta
- Order: Lepidoptera
- Family: Psychidae
- Genus: Apterona; Milliere, 1857

Genus of moths

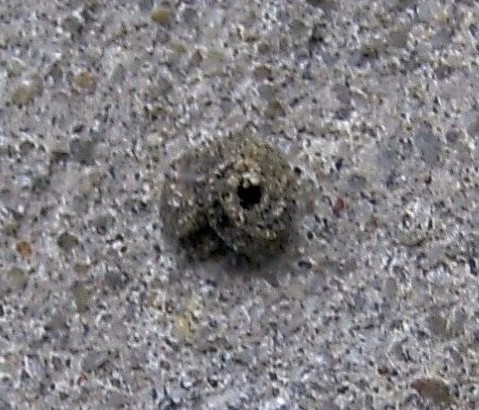
Apterona helicoidella

Apterona is a genus of moths belonging to the family Psychidae.

The genus was first described by Milliere in 1857.

The species of this genus are found in Europe and Northern America.

Species:

- Apterona crenulella (Bruand, 1853)
