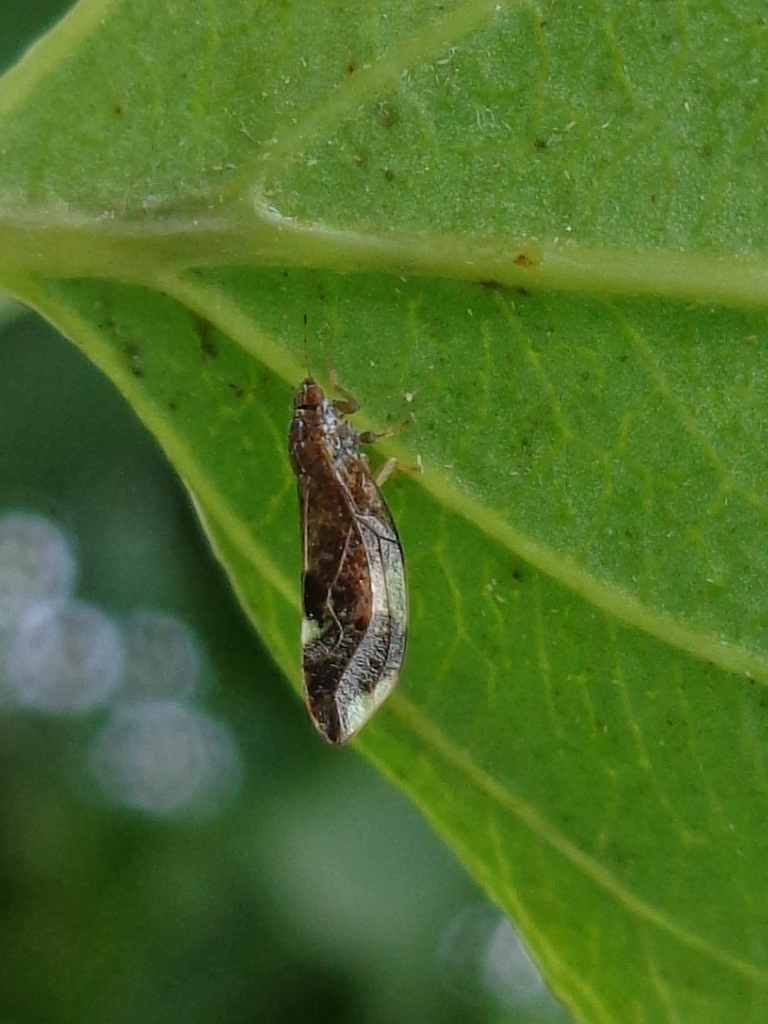
- Trichochermes walkeri

Scientific classification
- Domain: Eukaryota
- Kingdom: Animalia
- Phylum: Arthropoda
- Class: Insecta
- Order: Hemiptera
- Suborder: Sternorrhyncha
- Family: Triozidae
- Genus: Trichochermes; Kirkaldy, 1904

= Trichochermes =

Genus of true bugs

Trichochermes is a genus of true bugs belonging to the family Triozidae.

The species of this genus are found in Eurasia.

Species:

- Trichochermes certus Loginova, 1964
- Trichochermes grandis Loginova, 1965
- Trichochermes walkeri (Foerster, 1848)
