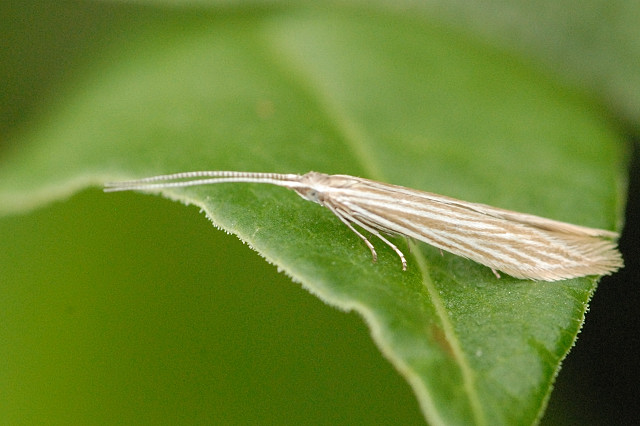

Scientific classification
- Kingdom: Animalia
- Phylum: Arthropoda
- Class: Insecta
- Order: Lepidoptera
- Family: Coleophoridae
- Genus: Coleophora
- Species: C. trochilella

Binomial name
- Coleophora trochilella (Duponchel, [1843])

Synonyms
- Ornix trochilella Duponchel, [1843]; Coleophora lineatella Tengström, 1848; Coleophora alpicola Heinemann & Wocke, 1877; Coleophora corymbosella Bauer, 1917; Coleophora axana Hering, 1942; Coleophora troglodytella Hering, 1957 (non Duponchel, 1843: misidentification)

= Coleophora trochilella =

Species of moth

Coleophora trochilella is a moth of the family Coleophoridae. It is found in all of Europe, with possible exception of parts of the Balkan Peninsula.

The wingspan is 11–14 mm.It is very similar to Coleophora follicularis and microscopic examination of the genitalia is required to separate the two.

Adults are on wing from June to July.

The larvae feed on Asteraceae species (Achillea, Artemisia vulgaris, Eupatorium, Tanacetum). The mouth angle is 45°-60°. The larvae are found at the leaf underside. Cases have been recorded from August to June of the following year.
