= Kalinda (disambiguation) =

Kalinda or Calinda is a martial art and associated dance form of the Caribbean.

Kalinda may also refer to:

== People ==
- Kalinda Ashton, an Australian writer and academic
- Kalinda Howarth, an Australian rules footballer
- Kalinda Vazquez, an American television writer and producer

== Arts and entertainment ==
- Kalinda, a character in the Star Trek: New Frontier novels
- Kalinda, a novel by Evan Green
- Kalinda Sharma, a character in the television series The Good Wife

== Other ==
- Kalinda, a legendary King of Tripura in the Bengali verse chronicle Rajmala
- Kalinda Primary School, in the City of Maroondah, Victoria, Australia
- Kalinda School, a school in New South Wales, Australia

== See also ==
- Calinda (disambiguation)
- Kalenda (disambiguation)
- Calends
