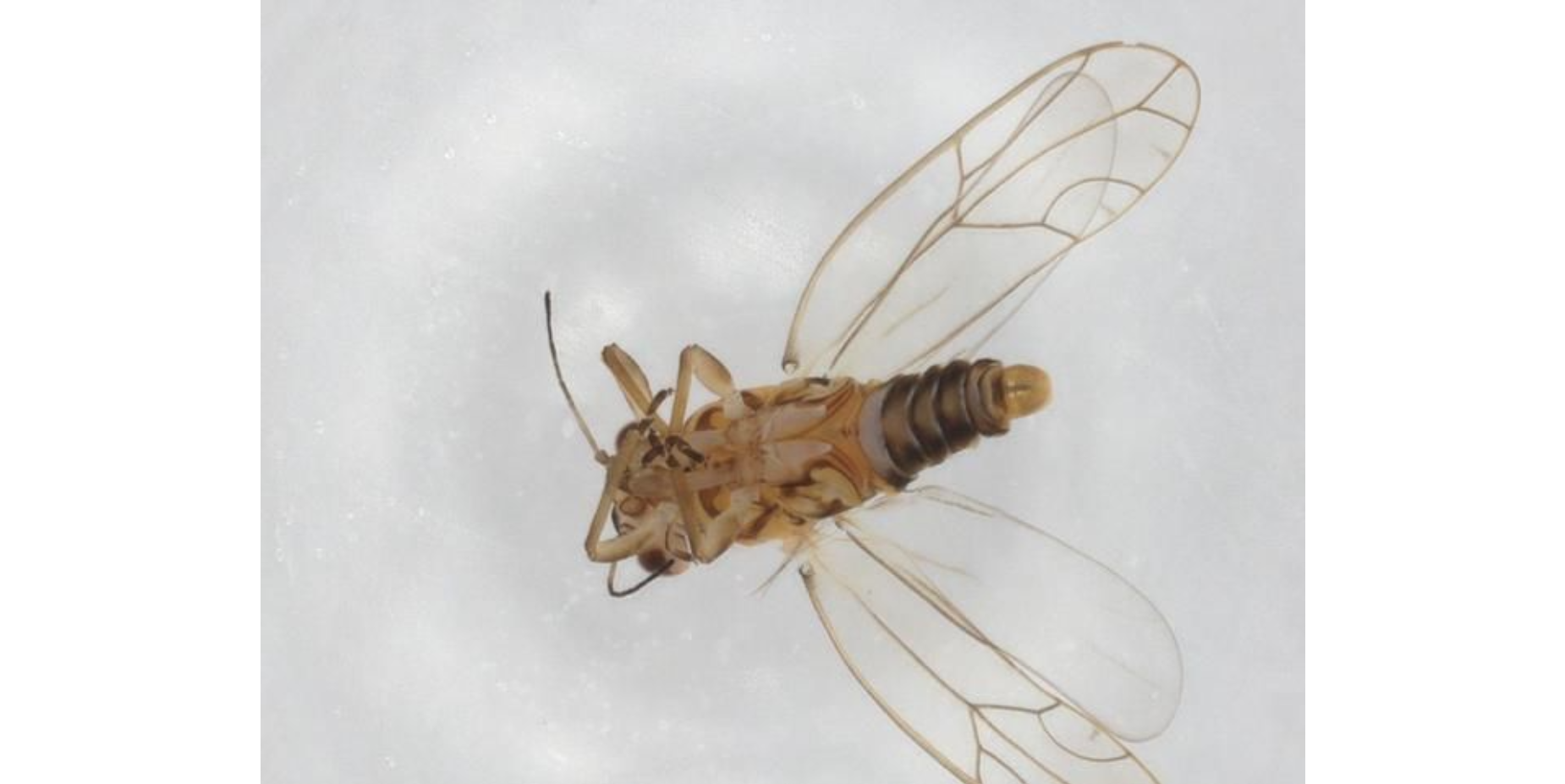
- Aacanthocnema dobsoni

Scientific classification
- Domain: Eukaryota
- Kingdom: Animalia
- Phylum: Arthropoda
- Class: Insecta
- Order: Hemiptera
- Suborder: Sternorrhyncha
- Family: Triozidae
- Genus: Aacanthocnema; Tuthill & Taylor, 1955

Type species
- Trioxa casuarinae Froggatt, 1901

= Aacanthocnema =

Genus of true bugs

Aacanthocnema is a genus of bugs from the jumping plant lice family (Triozidae). The genus is endemic to Australia, and currently contains six species, found in all states and territories with the exception of the Northern Territory.

== Species ==
- Aacanthocnema burckhardti Taylor, 2011
- Aacanthocnema casuarinae (Froggatt, 1901)
- Aacanthocnema dobsoni (Froggatt, 1903)
- Aacanthocnema huegelianae Taylor, 2011
- Aacanthocnema luehmannii Taylor, 2011
- Aacanthocnema torulosae Taylor, 2011
