= Hevaheva =

Scientific classification
- Domain: Eukaryota
- Kingdom: Animalia
- Phylum: Arthropoda
- Class: Insecta
- Order: Hemiptera
- Suborder: Sternorrhyncha
- Family: Triozidae
- Genus: Hevaheva; Kirkaldy, 1902

Genus of insects

Hevaheva is a genus of true bugs belonging to the family Triozidae.

Species:

- Hevaheva giffardi Crawford, 1918
- Hevaheva hyalina Crawford, 1918
- Hevaheva maculata Caldwell, 1940
- Hevaheva minuta Crawford, 1925
- Hevaheva monticola Kirkaldy, 1908
- Hevaheva perkinsi Kirkaldy, 1902 type species
- Hevaheva silvestris Kirkaldy, 1908
- Hevaheva swezeyi Crawford, 1928

Note: Etymology: Possibly named in honor of the Hawaiian religious leader Hewahewa
