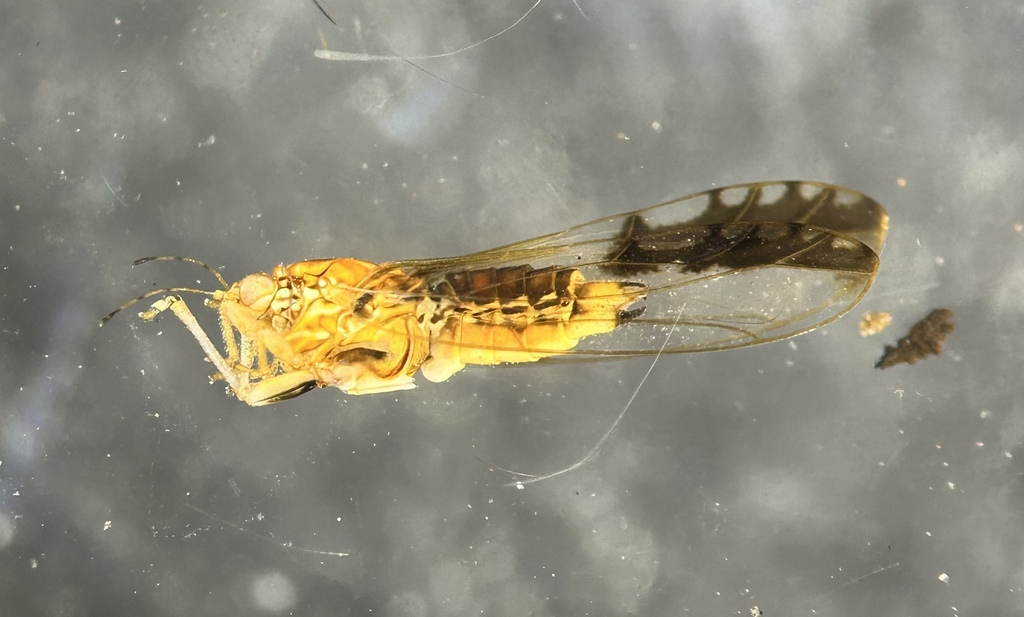
- Cerotrioza nigromacula

Scientific classification
- Kingdom: Animalia
- Phylum: Arthropoda
- Class: Insecta
- Order: Hemiptera
- Suborder: Sternorrhyncha
- Family: Triozidae
- Genus: Cerotrioza; Crawford, 1918

Species
- See text

= Cerotrioza =

Genus of insects

Cerotrioza is a genus of psyllid bugs in the family Triozidae.

== Description ==
Among Australian genera of psyllids, Cerotrioza can be distinguished by its elongate forewings (over 3x longer than wide) with extensive brown pigmentation. This pigmentation varies among species and is one of the features used in identification of species.

== Species ==
The following species are known from genus Cerotrioza:

- Cerotrioza bivittata Crawford, 1918
- Cerotrioza bridwelli Crawford, 1920
- Cerotrioza corniger (Crawford, 1919)
- Cerotrioza microceras (Crawford, 1919)
- Cerotrioza mukwanensis Fang and Yang, 1986
- Cerotrioza nigromacula Taylor, 2008

The species C. corniger and C. microceras were originally described in Cerotrioza but were then reassigned to the genus Leuronota. They were later returned to the genus Cerotrioza.
