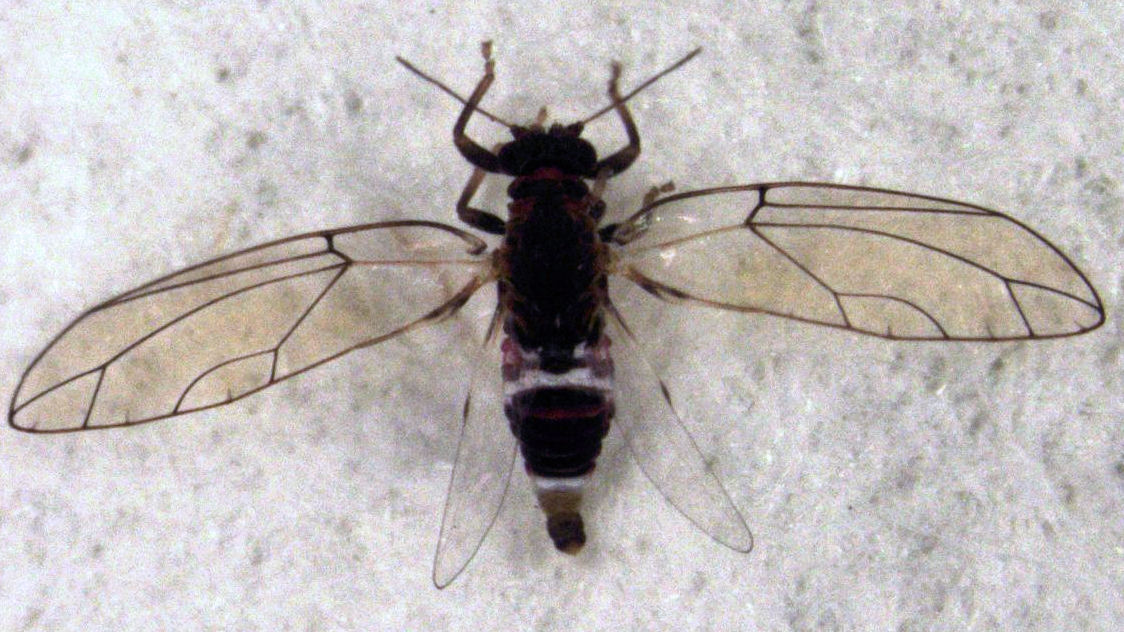

Scientific classification
- Domain: Eukaryota
- Kingdom: Animalia
- Phylum: Arthropoda
- Class: Insecta
- Order: Hemiptera
- Suborder: Sternorrhyncha
- Family: Triozidae
- Genus: Trioza
- Species: T. adventicia

Binomial name
- Trioza adventicia Tuthill, 1952

= Trioza adventicia =

Species of true bug

Trioza adventicia, commonly known as the syzygium leaf psyllid, lillypilly psyllid, or eugenia psyllid, is a sap-sucking hemipteran bug in the family Triozidae which creates galls on the leaves of Syzygium paniculatum. This species is native to eastern Australia and has been introduced into California, southern Australia, and New Zealand.

The nymphs form pit galls in the leaves and stunt the plant's growth.

Trioza adventicia was for decades identified as Trioza eugeniae Froggatt 1901 in the ornamental plant industry, in the field of biological pest control in the United States, and in its native eastern Australia, resulting in a large body of academic literature—and an even larger number of horticultural resources—using the latter name for the present species. Using multiple lines of morphological evidence and DNA barcoding, a 2019 study confirmed that T. adventicia and T. eugeniae are distinct species, and determined that the widespread introduced species on Syzygium paniculatum that had long been known as T. eugeniae is in fact T. adventicia. The true T. eugeniae is only known to occur in a small region of southeastern Australia.
