= Feltiella acarisuga =

Scientific classification
- Kingdom: Animalia
- Phylum: Arthropoda
- Clade: Pancrustacea
- Class: Insecta
- Order: Diptera
- Family: Cecidomyiidae
- Genus: Feltiella
- Species: F. acarisuga

Binomial name
- Feltiella acarisuga (Vallot, 1827)

Synonyms
- Cecidomyia acarisuga Vallot, 1827; Feltiella persicae (Kieffer, 1912); Feltiella tetranychi Rübsaamen, 1910; Therodiplosis persicae Kieffer, 1912

Species of fly

Feltiella acarisuga is a species of predatory gall midge which will feed on various species of spider mites. It is especially common when spider mites occur in colonies. It requires a high spider mite density and high humidities to become established.

== Mode of action ==
Adult gall-midges search for spider mite colonies actively and deposit eggs next to the spider mites. The larvae that hatch feed on spider mite eggs and suck them empty. It takes one week for the eggs to develop to mature larvae. The pupal stage takes approximately one week. Spider mites that are killed by the gall-midge shrivel up and become brown or black. Dozens of larvae can be found per spider mite infested leaf. White cocoons can be visible along the veins of the leaf.

== Use in biocontrol ==
Feltiella acarisuga can be used to manage spider mite populations in a variety of greenhouse and field crops. Each midge larva can consume an average of least 15 adult mites, 30 mixed developmental stages, or 80 eggs per day. F. acarisuga has been extremely effective for controlling spider mites on tomato, pepper and cucumber. F. acarisuga is also used to manage spider mites on strawberries and various ornamental crops.
