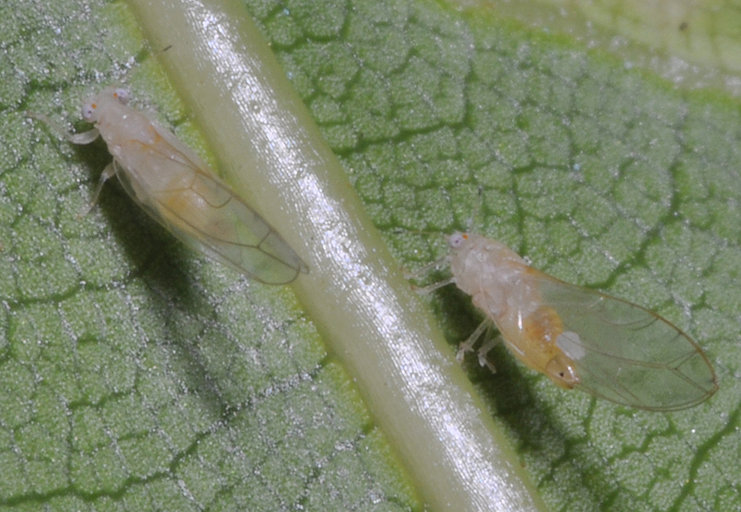

Scientific classification
- Domain: Eukaryota
- Kingdom: Animalia
- Phylum: Arthropoda
- Class: Insecta
- Order: Hemiptera
- Suborder: Sternorrhyncha
- Family: Triozidae
- Genus: Lauritrioza; Conci & Tamanini, 1986
- Species: L. alacris

Binomial name
- Lauritrioza alacris (Flor, 1861)

Synonyms
- Trioza alacris Flor, 1861

= Lauritrioza =

Genus of bugs

Lauritrioza is a monotypic genus of sap-sucking Psyllid bugs in the family Triozidae. The single species Lauritrioza alacris (originally described as Trioza alacris) creates galls on the leaves of Laurus species: mostly in Europe, including the British Isles, but also introduced to western N. America.

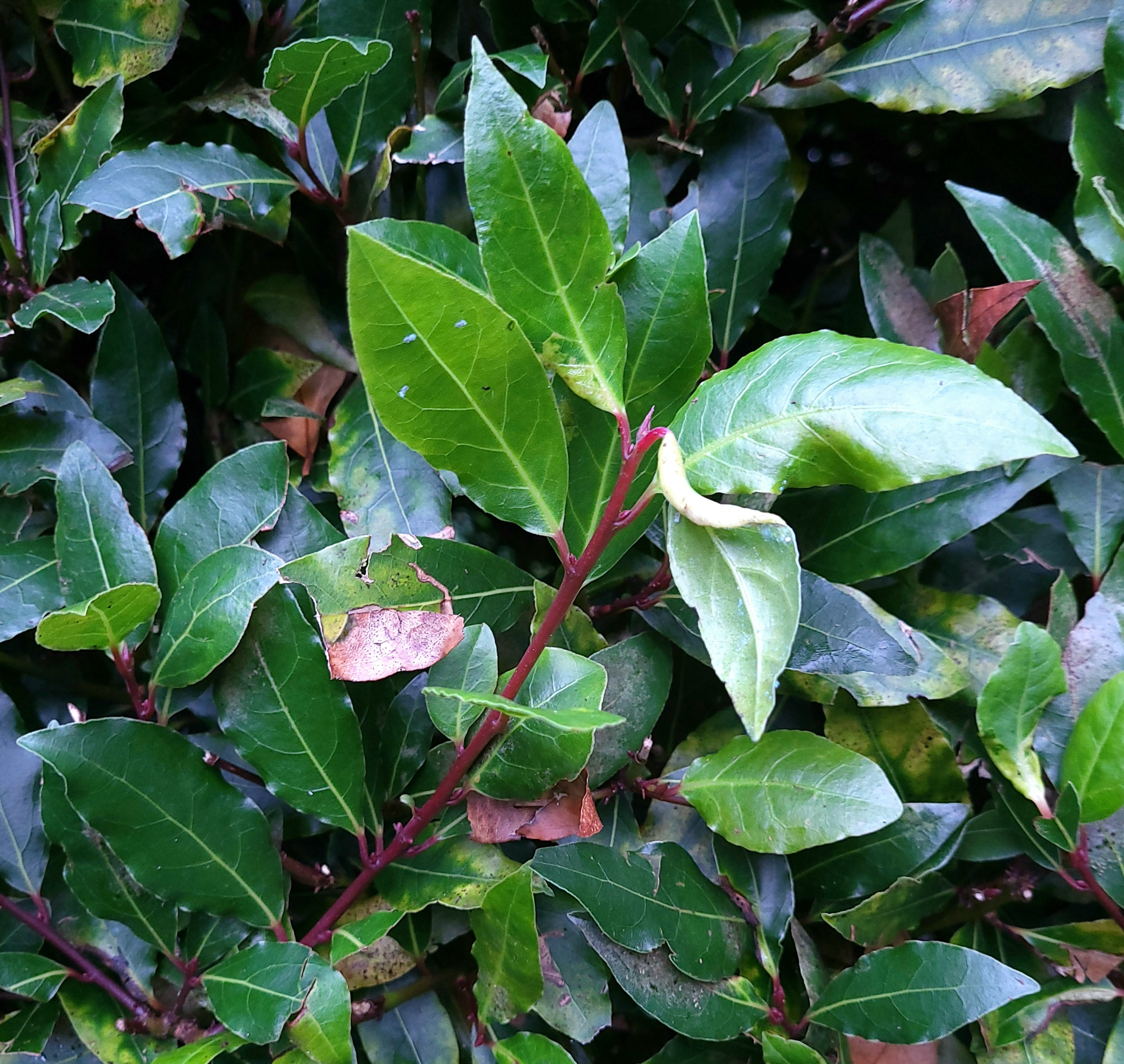
Gall on a bay leaf

== Description of the gall ==
Lauritrioza alacris causes the edges of leaves to thicken and roll downwards forming pale, elongated pouches. The galls can house two generations in a summer, of up to thirty pale-green nymphs, which are covered in a white wax. Adults can also be found in the gall. The adults usually overwinter in leaf litter but can also spend the winter in the gall. Species of Laurus galled include the Azores laurel (Laurus azorica), bay tree (Laurus nobilis), Laurus novocanariensis and Persea indica.
