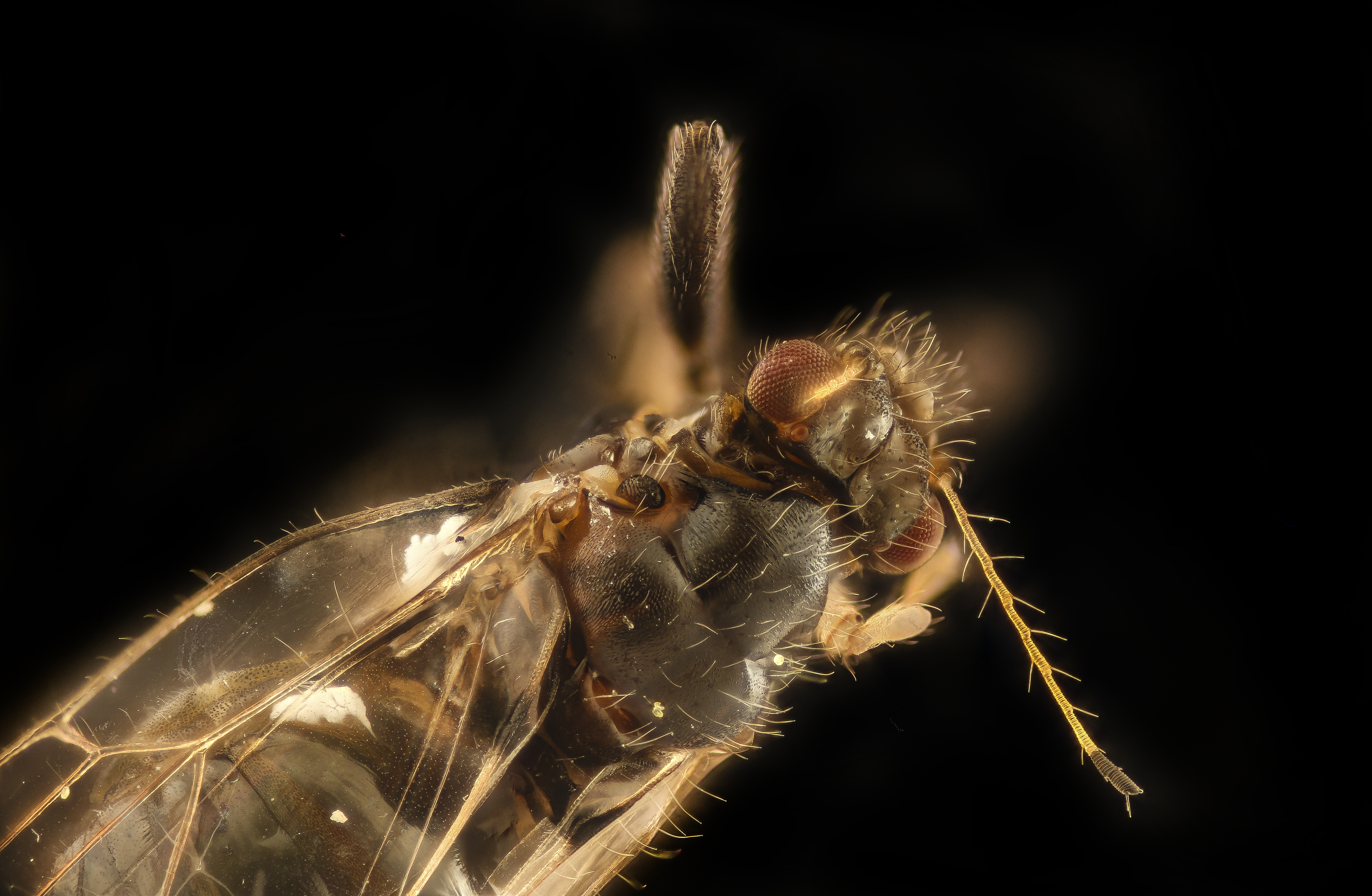

Scientific classification
- Domain: Eukaryota
- Kingdom: Animalia
- Phylum: Arthropoda
- Class: Insecta
- Order: Hemiptera
- Suborder: Sternorrhyncha
- Family: Triozidae
- Genus: Baeoalitriozus
- Species: B. diospyri

Binomial name
- Baeoalitriozus diospyri Ashmead 1881

Synonyms
- Trioza diospyri (Ashmead 1881)

= Baeoalitriozus diospyri =

Species of insect

Baeoalitriozus diospyri, the persimmon psyllid, is a species of Baeoalitriozus found in the United States and Mexico. The psyllids feed on Japanese persimmon as well as ornamental and native persimmons.
