= Baeoalitriozus =

Scientific classification
- Domain: Eukaryota
- Kingdom: Animalia
- Phylum: Arthropoda
- Class: Insecta
- Order: Hemiptera
- Suborder: Sternorrhyncha
- Family: Triozidae
- Genus: Baeoalitriozus; Li, 2011

Genus of bugs

Baeoalitriozus is a genus of true bugs belonging to the family Triozidae. The species of this genus are found in Northern America, Africa and Southeastern Asia.

== Species ==
Species:

- Baeoalitriozus afrobsoletus (Hollis, 1984)
- Baeoalitriozus afrosersalisia (Hollis, 1984)
- Baeoalitriozus asiaticus (Crawford, 1915)
- Baeoalitriozus boxi (Hollis, 1984)
- Baeoalitriozus bryani (Crawford, 1928)
- Baeoalitriozus catillus (Tuthill, 1964)
- Baeoalitriozus concavus (Tuthill, 1943)
- Baeoalitriozus diospyri (Ashmead, 1881)
- Baeoalitriozus fulgidiceps (Tuthill, 1964)
- Baeoalitriozus gonjae (Hollis, 1984)
- Baeoalitriozus magnicauda (Crawford, 1919)
- Baeoalitriozus mimusops (Hollis, 1984)
- Baeoalitriozus obsoletus (Buckton, 1900)
- Baeoalitriozus praelongus (Tuthill, 1964)
- Baeoalitriozus swezeyi (Crawford, 1927)
- Baeoalitriozus yangi Li, 2011
