= Calinda (bug) =

Scientific classification
- Domain: Eukaryota
- Kingdom: Animalia
- Phylum: Arthropoda
- Class: Insecta
- Order: Hemiptera
- Suborder: Sternorrhyncha
- Family: Triozidae
- Genus: Calinda; Blanchard, 1852

Genus of insects

Calinda is a genus of true bugs belonging to the family Triozidae.

The species of this genus are found in the Americas.

Species:

- Calinda aguilari (Tuthill, 1959)
- Calinda albonigra Olivares & Burckhardt, 1997
- Calinda ambigua Olivares & Burckhardt, 1997
- Calinda antucana Olivares & Burckhardt, 1997
- Calinda araucana Olivares & Burckhardt, 1997
- Calinda baccharidis (Tuthill, 1959)
- Calinda beingoleai (Tuthill, 1959)
- Calinda boldti Olivares & Burckhardt, 1997
- Calinda brevicauda Olivares & Burckhardt, 1997
- Calinda broomfieldi Olivares & Burckhardt, 1997
- Calinda chionophili Olivares & Burckhardt, 1997
- Calinda collaris (Crawford, 1910)
- Calinda falciforceps Olivares & Burckhardt, 1997
- Calinda fumipennis Olivares & Burckhardt, 1997
- Calinda gibbosa (Tuthill, 1959)
- Calinda gladiformis Olivares & Burckhardt, 1997
- Calinda graciliforceps Olivares & Burckhardt, 1997
- Calinda hodkinsoni Olivares & Burckhardt, 1997
- Calinda hollisi Olivares & Burckhardt, 1997
- Calinda huggerti Olivares & Burckhardt, 1997
- Calinda inca Olivares & Burckhardt, 1997
- Calinda jibara Olivares & Burckhardt, 1997
- Calinda lineata Blanchard, 1852
- Calinda longicaudata Olivares & Burckhardt, 1997
- Calinda longicollis Olivares & Burckhardt, 1997
- Calinda longistylus (Crawford, 1910)
- Calinda magniforceps (Tuthill, 1964)
- Calinda mendocina (Kieffer & Jörgensen, 1910)
- Calinda microcephala Olivares & Burckhardt, 1997
- Calinda muiscas Olivares & Burckhardt, 1997
- Calinda osorii Olivares & Burckhardt, 1997
- Calinda otavalo Olivares & Burckhardt, 1997
- Calinda panamensis (Brown & Hodkinson, 1988)
- Calinda parviceps (Tuthill, 1964)
- Calinda patagonica Olivares & Burckhardt, 1997
- Calinda pehuenche Olivares & Burckhardt, 1997
- Calinda penai Olivares & Burckhardt, 1997
- Calinda peruana (Tuthill, 1959)
- Calinda peterseni Olivares & Burckhardt, 1997
- Calinda plaumanni Olivares & Burckhardt, 1997
- Calinda proximata (Crawford, 1911)
- Calinda reversyi Olivares & Burckhardt, 1997
- Calinda salicifoliae Olivares & Burckhardt, 1997
- Calinda simoni (Tuthill, 1959)
- Calinda spatulata Olivares & Burckhardt, 1997
- Calinda testacea Blanchard, 1852
- Calinda trinervis Olivares & Burckhardt, 1997
- Calinda tuthilli Olivares & Burckhardt, 1997
- Calinda velardei (Tuthill, 1959)
- Calinda yungas Olivares & Burckhardt, 1997
