= Calenda (surname) =

Calenda is an Italian surname. Notable people with the surname include:

- Carlo Calenda (born 1973), Italian business executive and politician
- Constance Calenda (fl. 1415), Italian surgeon
- Roméo Calenda (born 1972), French football player
