= Jean Nicolas Vallot =

French entomologist (1771–1860)

Jean Nicolas Vallot (22 February 1771 in Dijon – 22 January 1860, idem) was a French entomologist. He wrote Détermination précise des insectes nuisibles, mentionnés dans les différents traités relatifs à la culture des arbres fruitiers, et indications des moyens à employer pour s'opposer à leurs ravages (1827)

He described the predatory gall midge Feltiella acarisuga.

== Publications ==
- Ichthyologie française; ou Histoire naturelle des poissons d'eau douce de la France (in-8°) (in French). Dijon: E. Frantin. 1837. p. 321..
- Concordance systématique, servant de table de matières à l'ouvrage de Réaumur intitulé; Mémoires pour servir à l'histoire des insectes (in-8°) (in French). Paris: Grégoire Thouvenin. 1802. p. 218..
- Observations d'histoire naturelle; Détermination de plusieurs animaux aquatiques mentionnés par Rondelet et négligés par les naturalistes modernes (in-8°) (in French). Dijon: E. Frantin..
