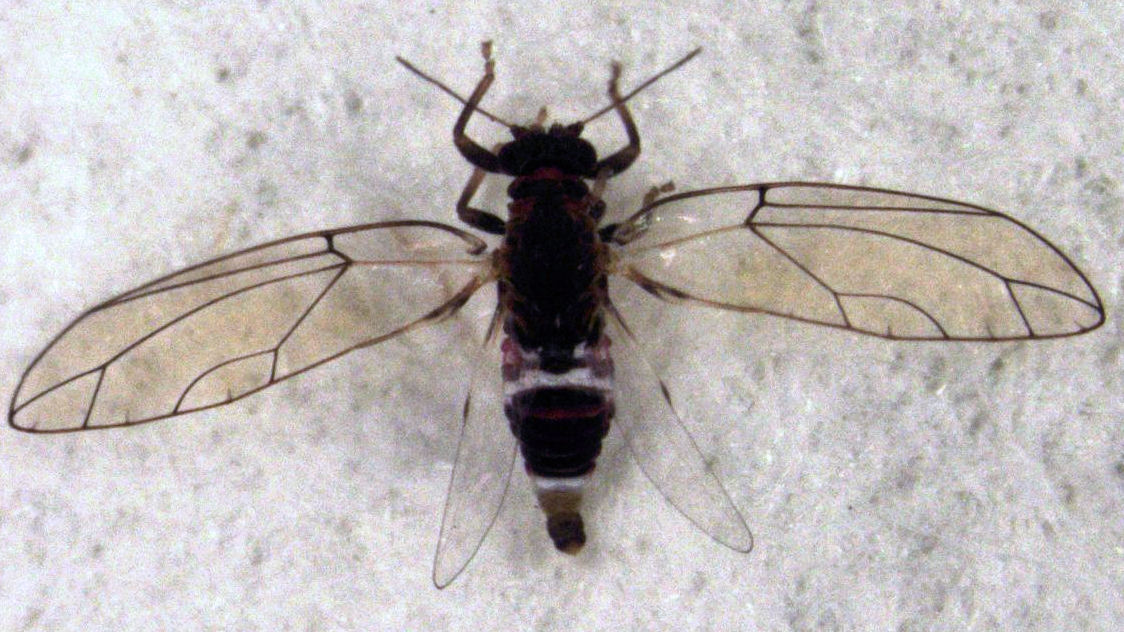
- Trioza adventicia, showing the trifurcation in wing veins

Scientific classification
- Kingdom: Animalia
- Phylum: Arthropoda
- Clade: Pancrustacea
- Class: Insecta
- Order: Hemiptera
- Suborder: Sternorrhyncha
- Superfamily: Psylloidea
- Family: Triozidae; Löw, 1879

Synonyms
- Rhinopsyllidae

= Triozidae =

Family of true bugs

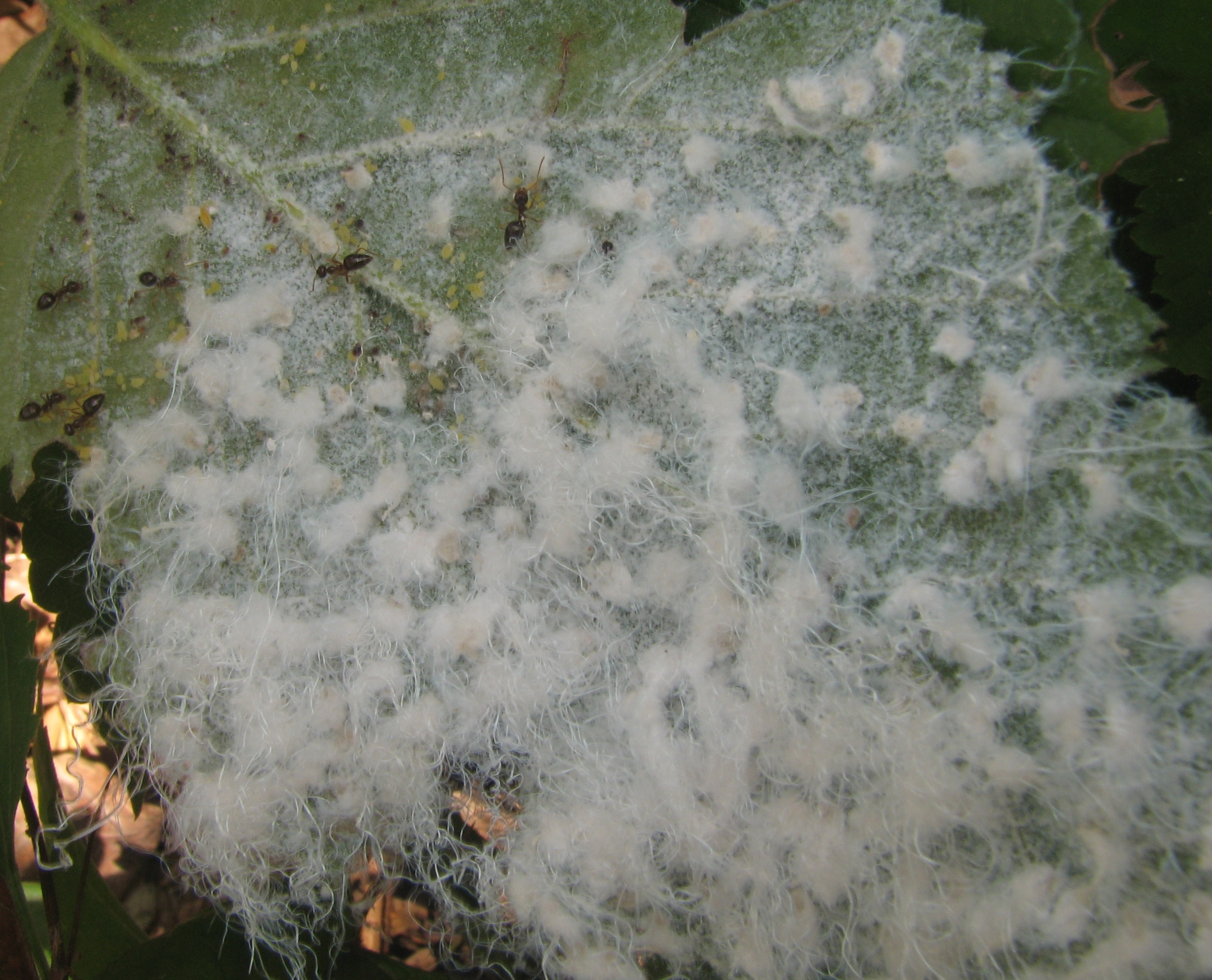
Phylloplecta tripunctata nymphs on underside of leaf of Rubus

Triozidae is one of seven families, collectively referred to as plant lice, based on the type genus Trioza. They had traditionally been considered part of a single family, Psyllidae, but recent classifications divide the superfamily into a total of seven families; most of the genera remain in the Psyllidae, but Triozidae is the third-largest family in the group.

The family contains a number of agricultural pest species including:

- Baeoalitriozus diospyri, the persimmon psyllid
- Bactericera cockerelli, the potato psyllid
- Lauritrioza alacris, infesting bay trees and their relatives
- Trioza erytreae, the African citrus psyllid

== Genera ==
The Global Biodiversity Information Facility currently (2025) includes:

1. Aacanthocnema Tuthill & Taylor, 1955
2. Acanthocasuarina Taylor, 2011
3. Afrotrioza Hollis, 1984
4. Anomocephala Tuthill, 1942
5. Asiotrioza Li, 2011
6. Astutia Loginova, 1976
7. Bactericera Puton, 1876
8. Baeoalitriozus Li, 2011
9. Berchemitrioza Li, 2011
10. Calinda Blanchard, 1852
11. Carsitria Li, 1997
12. Casuarinicola Taylor, 2010
13. Cecidotrioza Kieffer, 1908
14. Ceropsylla Riley, 1883
15. Cerotrioza Crawford, 1918
16. Choricymoza Bliven, 1955
17. Chouitrioza Li, 1989
18. Colopelma Enderlein, 1926
19. Conicotrioza Li
20. Crawforda Caldwell, 1940
21. Dolichotrioza Li, 2002
22. Drepanoza Bastin, Burckhardt, Reyes-Betancort, Hernández-Suárez & Ouvrard, 2023
23. Dyspersa S.M.Klimaszewski, 1968
24. Egeirotrioza Boselli, 1931
25. Engytatoneura Loginova, 1972
26. Eotrioza Konovalova, 1987
27. Epitrioza Kuwayama, 1909-1910
28. Eryngiofaga Klimaszewski, 1968
29. Eustenopsylla Yang, 1984
30. Eutrioza Loginova, 1964
31. Evegeirotrioza Li, 2011
32. Furcitrioza Li, 2011
33. Genotriozus Li, 2011
34. Hemischizocranium Tuthill, 1956
35. Hemitrioza Crawford, 1914
36. Heterotrioza Dobreanu & Manolache, 1960
37. Hevaheva Kirkaldy, 1902
38. Hippophaetrioza Conci & Tamanini, 1984
39. Homotrioza Yang, 1984
40. Izpania Klimaszewski, 1962
41. Kuwayama Crawford, 1911
42. Lauritrioza Conci & Tamanini, 1986
43. Leptotrioza Miyatake, 1972
44. Leptynoptera Crawford, 1919
45. Leuronota Crawford, 1914
46. Levidea Tuthill, 1938
47. Megatrioza Crawford, 1915
48. Metatrioza Tuthill, 1939
49. Metatriozidus Li, 2011
50. Myotrioza Taylor
51. Myrmecephala Tuthill, 1945
52. Neolithus Scott, 1882
53. Neorhinopsylla Drohojowska, 2006
54. Neotrioza Kieffer, 1905
55. Neotriozella Crawford, 1911
56. Nothotrioza Burckhardt, 2013
57. Optomopsylla Caldwell, 1944
58. Ozotrioza Kieffer, 1905
59. Paracomeca Laing, 1923
60. Parastenopsylla Yang, 1984
61. Paratrioza Crawford, 1910
62. Pariaconus Enderlein, 1926
63. Pauropsylla Ruebsaamen, 1899
64. Paurotriozana Caldwell, 1940
65. Percyella Bastin, Burckhardt & Ouvrard, 2023
66. Petalolyma Scott, 1882
67. Phylloplecta Riley, 1884
68. Phylloplecta Zacher, 1913
69. Powellia Maskell, 1879
70. Pseudotrioza Miyatake, 1972
71. Rhegmoza Enderlein, 1918
72. Rhinopsylla Riley, 1884
73. †Rhinopsyllida Klimaszewski, 1996
74. Schedoneolithus Tuthill, 1959
75. Schedotrioza Tuthill & Taylor, 1955
76. Siphonaleyrodes - monotypic S. formosanus Takahashi, 1932
77. Spanioza Enderlein, 1926
78. Stenopsylla Kuwayama, 1909
79. Stevekenia Percy
80. Swezeyana Caldwell, 1940
81. Torulus Li, 1991
82. Trachotrioza Li, 2011
83. Trichochermes Kirkaldy, 1904
84. Trichopsylla Thomson, 1877
85. †Trioacantha Klimaszewski, 1998
86. Triochochermes Kirkaldy, 1904
87. Trioza Förster, 1848
88. Triozidus Li, 1994
89. Triozoida Crawford, 1911
90. Trisetitrioza Li, 1995
