= Zebra chip =

Plant disease in potatoes

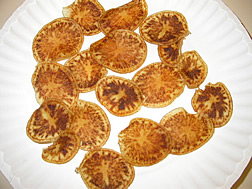
Potato chips (crisps) have a higher percentage of visible infection than raw tubers, given the same batch of potatoes.

Zebra chip, also known as papa manchada and papa rayada, is a disease in potatoes putatively caused by an alphaproteobacterium "Candidatus Liberibacter solanacearum", which is vectored by the potato psyllid. When fried, potato tubers from infected plants develop unsightly black lines resembling the stripes of zebras that render the chips unsellable. Additionally, striped sections of chips frequently burn and caramelize, resulting in a bitter flavor. No health risks have been connected with consumption of infected potato chips.

== Emergence ==
Zebra chip was first identified in 1994 near Saltillo, Mexico, and was originally named papa manchada (stained potato). In the early 1990s, Texas potato farms reported afflictions, though the disease was not identified in the state until 2000. Since then, zebra chip has been reported in the U.S. states of Arizona, California, Colorado, Idaho, Oregon, Kansas, Nebraska, and New Mexico. Since 2000, Guatemala reported a disease known as papa rayada (striped potato), which has been identified as zebra chip. New Zealand's first suspected case of zebra chip occurred in May 2008, when an Auckland greenhouse reported similar symptoms. In October 2012, the Australian government reviewed the importation of potatoes from New Zealand because of the presence of the disease in the country. Eastern Europe and southern Russia may also be currently experiencing the disease.

== Cause ==
An experiment carried out by scientists from the USDA Agricultural Research Service's Vegetable and Forage Crops Research Unit indicates that creating chips from infected raw potatoes increases the visibility of zebra chip. The researchers correlated the presence of the tomato potato psyllid Bactericera cockerelli, which infests both potatoes and tomatoes, to the presence of zebra chip. One of the scientists also reported that targeting the suspected hosts, psyllids, with insect control measures proved effective at stopping the disease. Though early reports suggested the cause might be a bacterium, namely Candidatus Liberibacter, studies have not been able to consistently associate any phytoplasmas with the disease.

It is currently postulated that the potato psyllid acts as a vector for the disease's unknown pathogen, as it is the only organism consistently associated with zebra chip. In 2008, New Zealand researchers investigating a B. cockerelli infestation in tomato and pepper greenhouses discovered a new bacterial species Candidatus Liberibacter solanacearum whose genetic markers were found to be identical to those found at two potato farms in Texas. This bacterium is related to Candidatus Liberibacter spp., which cause citrus greening disease in citrus plants.

There are currently three haplotypes of the bacterium ‘Candidatus Liberibacter solanacearum’ that infect potato: haplotypes A, B, and F. Haplotype F was the latest to be discovered in Oregon's Klamath Basin.

== Signs ==
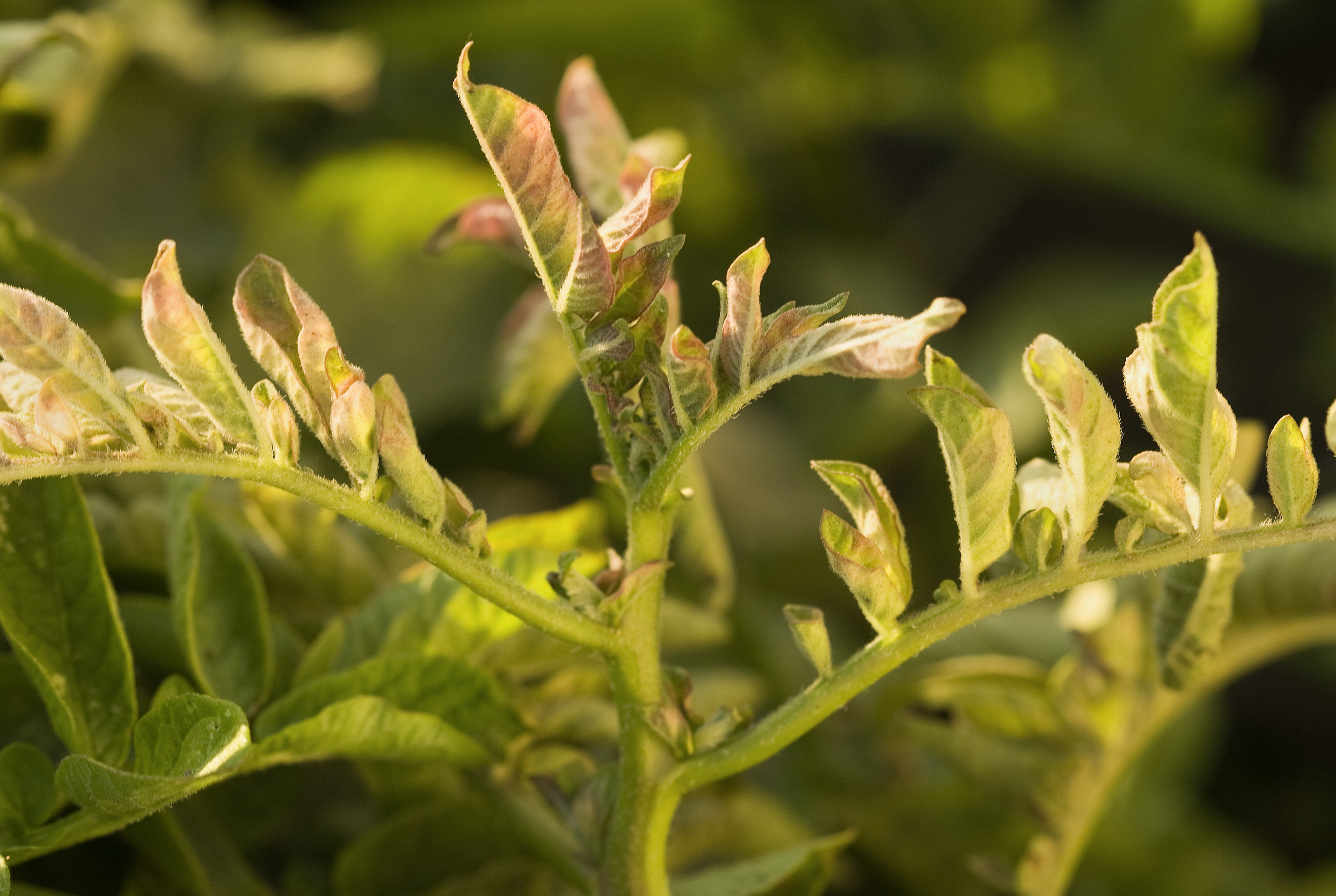
A potato plant showing typical zebra chip symptoms, including rolling up and stunting of the top leaves and purple discoloration.

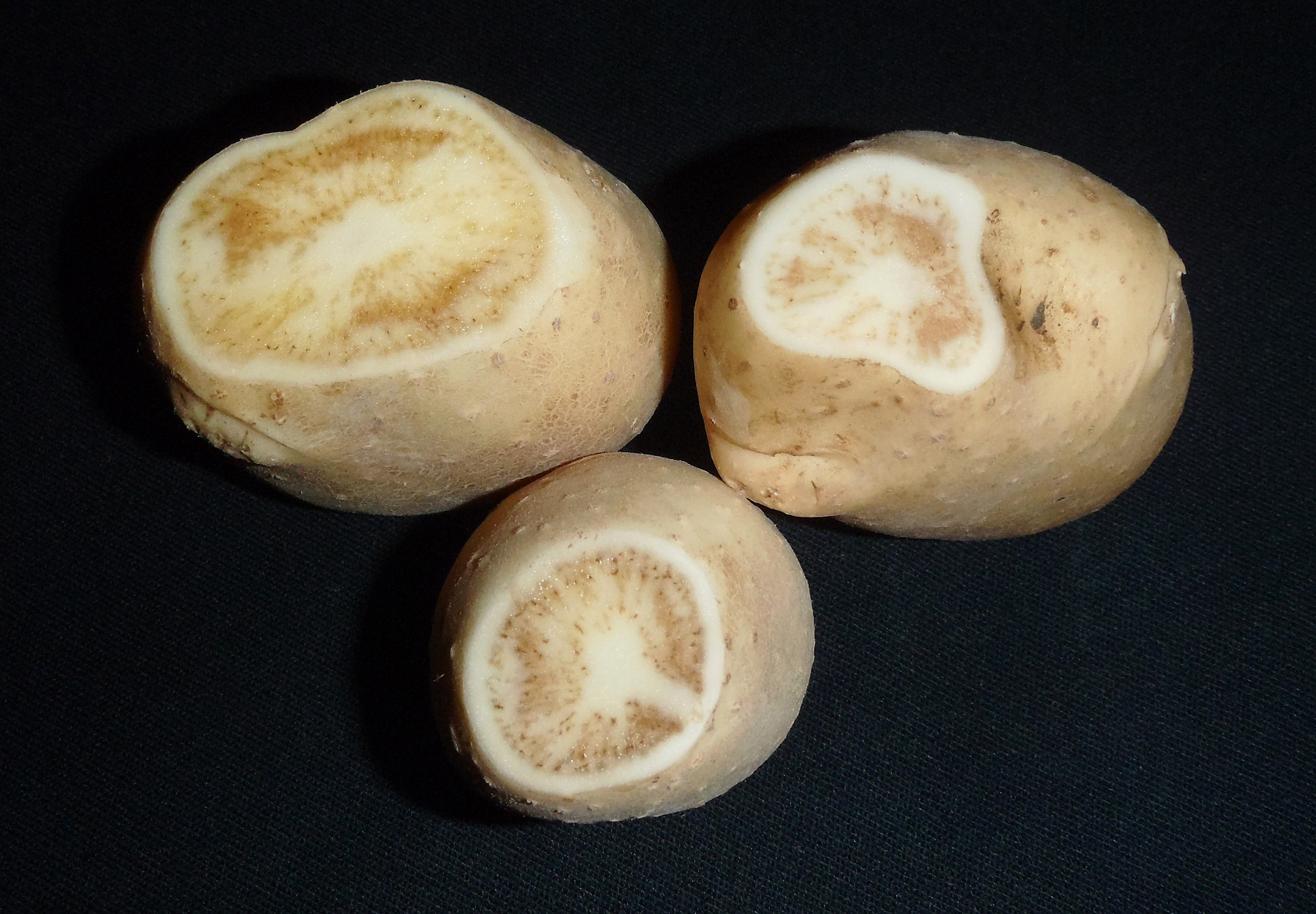
Potatoes infected with zebra chip.

Scientists suggest that zebra chip's namesake sign is caused by the conversion of potato starch to water-soluble sugar, causing the stripes to appear upon cooking. Another study suggests that discoloration is due to enzymatic browning involving a polyphenol oxidase.

Many zebra chip symptoms are evident before the potato is even harvested; foliar signs include chlorosis, leaf scorching, swollen nodes, vascular tissue browning, and curled leaves. Subterranean signs include collapsed stolons, enlarged lenticels, vascular tissue browning, medullary ray discoloration, and necrotic flecking of tuber tissue. The University of Nebraska cites the subterranean signs as the unique identification of zebra chip from all other known potato diseases. Zebra chip has been noted among potato disease experts as being unusually complex, and possibly the product of two separate pathogens, as has been discovered before for basses richesses (SBR) and spraing.

== Management ==
Partners of the CABI-led programme, Plantwise, including the Secretaría de Agricultura y Ganadería (SAG) in Honduras provide several recommendations for managing Zebra chip in potato. These include; reducing soil acidity before sowing, using certified seeds and removing any diseased plants. They also recommend practicing crop rotation to prepare the soil and not to sow any other hosts for 3 years so that bacteria on the soil will die.

== Economic impact ==
Much of the economic impact of zebra chip stems not from edibility issues, but cosmetic ones; while not deemed hazardous to one's health, infected potatoes are visually unappealing and will not be purchased by processing companies. From this refusal stems most of the other costs, including lost wages from processing fewer potatoes.

=== New Zealand ===
After the initial June 2008 discovery of the new species of Candidatus Liberibacter solanacearum, 14 countries implemented bans on various New Zealand crops and New Zealand withdrew export certification for tomatoes and capsicums as a precautionary measure. New Zealand's export certification has since been reinstated and some countries have indicated they will accept fruit again. Fiji stopped imports from New Zealand of potatoes, tomatoes, and capsicum, but ended the bans in July 2008. While French Polynesia did not ban any crops immediately, its restrictions were deemed unreasonable by New Zealand and all potato and capsicum exports to French Polynesia were halted. Having previously blocked imports of potatoes, Australia expanded that ban to include capsicum, tomatoes, cape gooseberries, tomatillos, and five other crops.

Though it may be too early to estimate the economic impact of these bans, New Zealand's tomato and capsicum exports combined earn the nation over NZ$41 million (about US$30 million, August 2008) annually.

=== Texas, United States ===
Some farms in Texas have reported losses exceeding US$2 million in both 2005 and 2006, with about 35-40% of Texas potato farm acreage affected. Using IMPLAN, a macroeconomic impact model based upon average annual potato production in the state from 2003 to 2005, the total estimated lost product amounted to 38% of all potato production totaling $25.86 million. The economic impact reached beyond just the crop, however, resulting in estimates of total business losses of $125 million and total job losses of 970. The Center for North American Studies' report also predicted that if the disease is not stopped soon, South Texas could lose all of its potato crop and abandon farming of potatoes.

=== Pacific Northwest, United States ===
In the Pacific Northwest, where over 50% of the U.S. potatoes are grown, it was estimated to cost 11 million U.S. dollars to control the psyllid in a year.

European Union

According to European Commission Delegated Regulation of 1 August 2019 Candidatus Liberibacter spp. is officially listed as a quarantine pest in the European Union. According to a study of 2012, the annual losses due to the pathogen were calculated at more than €220 million.

== See also ==
- List of potato diseases
- Psyllid yellows

== Sources ==
This article incorporates text from a free content work. Licensed under CC-BY-SA (license statement/permission). Text taken from Plantwise Factsheets for Farmers: The bacteria in potato, Mariela Lilibeth Lara, CABI.
