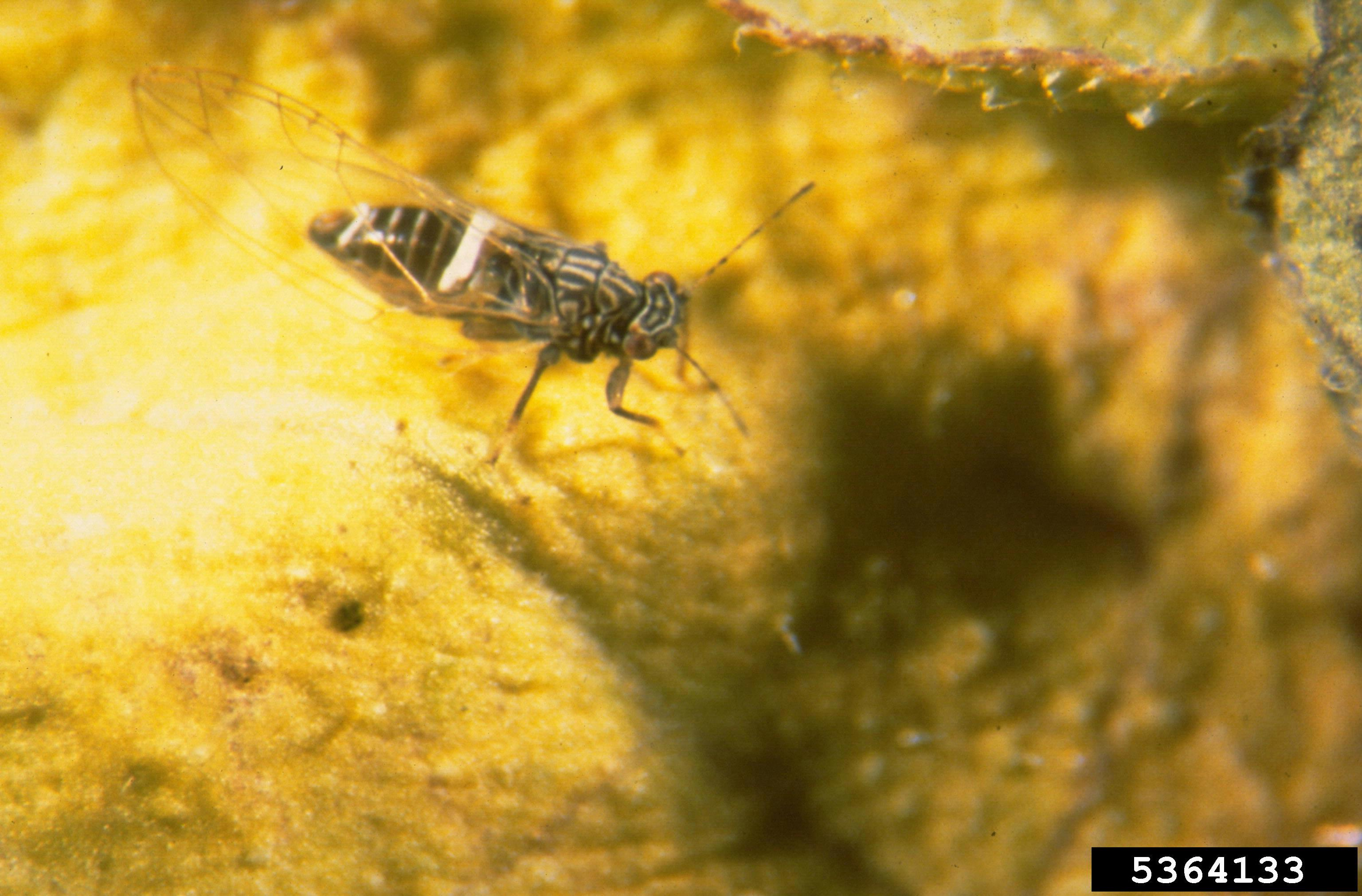
- Bactericera cockerelli, feeding on a potato and infects it with Candidatus Liberibacter solanacearum

Scientific classification
- Kingdom: Animalia
- Phylum: Arthropoda
- Clade: Pancrustacea
- Class: Insecta
- Order: Hemiptera
- Suborder: Sternorrhyncha
- Family: Triozidae
- Genus: Bactericera; Puton, 1876

Synonyms
- Rhinopsylla Riley, 1885; Paratrioza Crawford, 1910; Allotrioza Crawford, 1911; Smirnovia Klimaszewski, 1968; Klimaszewskiella Lauterer, 1976; Eubactericera Li, 1994

= Bactericera =

Genus of true bugs

Bactericera is a mostly Palaearctic and Nearctic plant louse genus in the family Triozidae; it was erected by Auguste Puton in 1876.

== Species ==
The Global Biodiversity Information Facility lists:

1. Bactericera acutipennis (Zetterstedt, 1828)
2. Bactericera albiventris (Foerster, 1848)
3. Bactericera alboparia (Loginova, 1979)
4. Bactericera allivora (Li, 1994)
5. Bactericera alticola (Baeva, 1969)
6. Bactericera antennata (Crawford, 1910)
7. Bactericera arbolensis (Crawford, 1910)
8. Bactericera arctica (Hodkinson, 1978)
9. Bactericera arcuata (Tuthill, 1942)
10. Bactericera artemisiae (Baeva, 1971)
11. Bactericera artemisicola (Li, 1995)
12. Bactericera artemisisuga (Li, 1995)
13. Bactericera aterokera Li, 2005
14. Bactericera athenae (Crawford, 1914)
15. Bactericera atkasookensis (Hodkinson, 1978)
16. Bactericera atraphaxidis (Loginova, 1964)
17. Bactericera baiancogti (Klimaszewski, 1966)
18. Bactericera berberae Li, 2011
19. Bactericera bielawskii (Klimaszewski, 1963)
20. Bactericera bifurca (Tuthill, 1944)
21. Bactericera bimaculata (Li, 1989)
22. Bactericera bohemica (Šulc, 1913)
23. Bactericera brachycephala Li, 2011
24. Bactericera breviatiformis Kwon, 1983
25. Bactericera brevineura Li, 2011
26. Bactericera bucegica (Dobreanu & Manolache, 1962)
27. Bactericera calcarata (Schaefer, 1949)
28. Bactericera calceolaris (Baeva, 1969)
29. Bactericera californica (Crawford, 1910)
30. Bactericera camplurigra (Li, 1989)
31. Bactericera capensis (Hollis, 1984)
32. Bactericera capillariclvata Li, 2011
33. Bactericera carthamae (Li, 1994)
34. Bactericera cerinimaculata Li, 2011
35. Bactericera cockerelli (Šulc, 1909)
36. Bactericera commutata (Li, 1995)
37. Bactericera conicifolia Li, 2011
38. Bactericera cordatifolia Li, 2011
39. Bactericera cousiniae (Baeva, 1987)
40. Bactericera crasseflagellata (Loginova, 1969)
41. Bactericera crithmi (Löw, 1880)
42. Bactericera cucullata (Li, 1995)
43. Bactericera curvata (Li & Sun, 1994)
44. Bactericera curvatinerivs (Förster, 1848)
45. Bactericera curvatinervis (Foerster, 1848)
46. Bactericera cuspidata (Li & Yang, 1994)
47. Bactericera daedala (Loginova, 1972)
48. Bactericera daghestanica (Gegechkori, 1980)
49. Bactericera decurticapta Li, 2005
50. Bactericera distinctissima Kwon & Lee, 1981
51. Bactericera dorsalis (Crawford, 1914)
52. Bactericera dracunculi Loginova, 1964
53. Bactericera drepanoides (Li, 1995)
54. Bactericera dubia (Tuthill, 1943)
55. Bactericera dzhamantalica (Baeva, 1976)
56. Bactericera electa (Klimaszewski, 1968)
57. Bactericera equisetifolii Burckhardt & Lauterer, 1997
58. Bactericera euclidiae Li, 2011
59. Bactericera euclidicola Li, 2011
60. Bactericera falcata (Baeva, 1974)
61. Bactericera femoralis (Foerster, 1848)
62. Bactericera ferulae (Baeva, 1969)
63. Bactericera flavipunctata (Li, 1995)
64. Bactericera frigeiarea Li, 2011
65. Bactericera fusina Li, 2011
66. Bactericera gobica (Loginova, 1972)
67. Bactericera grammica (Li, 1995)
68. Bactericera gyrophylla Li, 2011
69. Bactericera haloxylae Li, 2011
70. Bactericera harrisoni (Wagner, 1955)
71. Bactericera hissarica (Baeva, 1985)
72. Bactericera horrida (Loginova, 1979)
73. Bactericera imitodua (Klimaszewski, 1966)
74. Bactericera incerta (Tuthill, 1943)
75. Bactericera janisalicis (Li, 1995)
76. Bactericera jialingensis Li, 2011
77. Bactericera jilinisalicis (Li, 1994)
78. Bactericera kangxianana Li, 2005
79. Bactericera kartlica (Gegechkori, 1975)
80. Bactericera koreana (Klimaszewski, 1968)
81. Bactericera koreostriola Kwon, 1983
82. Bactericera kratochvili Vondráček, 1957
83. Bactericera lavaterae (Van Duzee, 1924)
84. Bactericera ligulariae (Baeva, 1973)
85. Bactericera liupanshanana Li, 2011
86. Bactericera lobata (Crawford, 1914)
87. Bactericera loginovae (Klimaszewski, 1962)
88. Bactericera lycii (Loginova, 1970)
89. Bactericera lyrata Seljak, Malenovský & Lauterer, 2008
90. Bactericera maculipennis (Crawford, 1910)
91. Bactericera malleicapta Li, 2005
92. Bactericera maura (Foerster, 1848)
93. Bactericera melanoparia (Loginova, 1964)
94. Bactericera minuta (Crawford, 1910)
95. Bactericera miyatakei Kwon & Lee, 1981
96. Bactericera miyatakeiana Lauterer, Yang & Fang, 1988
97. Bactericera modesta (Foerster, 1848)
98. Bactericera mora (Loginova, 1972)
99. Bactericera myohyangi (Klimaszewski, 1968)
100. Bactericera nigrabdominalis Li, 2011
101. Bactericera nigriceps (Kuwayama, 1910)
102. Bactericera nigriclavata Li, 2011
103. Bactericera nigricornis (Foerster, 1848)
104. Bactericera nobilis Kwon, 1983
105. Bactericera obuncata (Loginova, 1979)
106. Bactericera octocalcarata Lauterer, Yang & Fang, 1988
107. Bactericera ordosiclavata Li, 2011
108. Bactericera oreophila (Baeva, 1968)
109. Bactericera parastriola Conci, Ossiannilsson & Tamanini, 1988
110. Bactericera permira (Loginova, 1972)
111. Bactericera perrisii Puton, 1876
112. Bactericera petiolata (Loginova, 1960)
113. Bactericera planicapita Li, 2011
114. Bactericera pletschi (Tuthill, 1944)
115. Bactericera polygoni (Baeva, 1983)
116. Bactericera prangi (Baeva, 1967)
117. Bactericera psammophila Li, 2011
118. Bactericera pulla (Tuthill, 1939)
119. Bactericera qinghaiensis Li, 2011
120. Bactericera reuteri (Šulc, 1913)
121. Bactericera rhabdoclada Li, 2011
122. Bactericera rossica (Horváth, 1901)
123. Bactericera rubra (Tuthill, 1939)
124. Bactericera sachalinensis Klimaszewski, 1983
125. Bactericera salicigra (Li, 1994)
126. Bactericera salicivora (Reuter, 1876)
127. Bactericera salictaria (Loginova, 1964)
128. Bactericera sarahae Kwon & Kwon, 2020
129. Bactericera schwarzii (Riley, 1885)
130. Bactericera scutinigra (Li, 1994)
131. Bactericera seselii (Loginova, 1979)
132. Bactericera shepherdiae (Tuthill, 1938)
133. Bactericera sichunana Li, 2011
134. Bactericera silvarnis (Hodkinson, 1974)
135. Bactericera singularis (Tuthill, 1943)
136. Bactericera sinica Au?
137. Bactericera stonyophylla Li, 2011
138. Bactericera striola (Flor, 1861)
139. Bactericera substriola Ossiannilsson, 1992
140. Bactericera taeguensis Park & Lee, 1985
141. Bactericera tangae (Hollis, 1984)
142. Bactericera tianchiensis Li, 2011
143. Bactericera tiliae (Li, 1994)
144. Bactericera tongxinensis Li, 2011
145. Bactericera tremblayi (Wagner, 1961)
146. Bactericera trigonica Hodkinson, 1981
147. Bactericera tubconica (Li, 1995)
148. Bactericera varians (Crawford, 1910)
149. Bactericera vellae Burckhardt & Lauterer, 1997
150. Bactericera versicolor (Löw, 1888)
151. Bactericera viresalicis (Li, 1994)
152. Bactericera vitiis (Li, 1994)
153. Bactericera xanthoprocta Li, 2005
154. Bactericera xanthura (Loginova, 1972)
155. Bactericera xeranthemica (Gegechkori, 1990)
156. Bactericera xinjiangica Li, 2011
157. Bactericera xizangiensis Li, 2011
158. Bactericera yamagishii Kwon & Lee, 1981
159. Bactericera yiningica Li, 2011
160. Bactericera zhaoi (Li, 1997)
161. Bactericera zhongtiaonica Li, 2011
162. Bactericera zhoui Li, 2011
