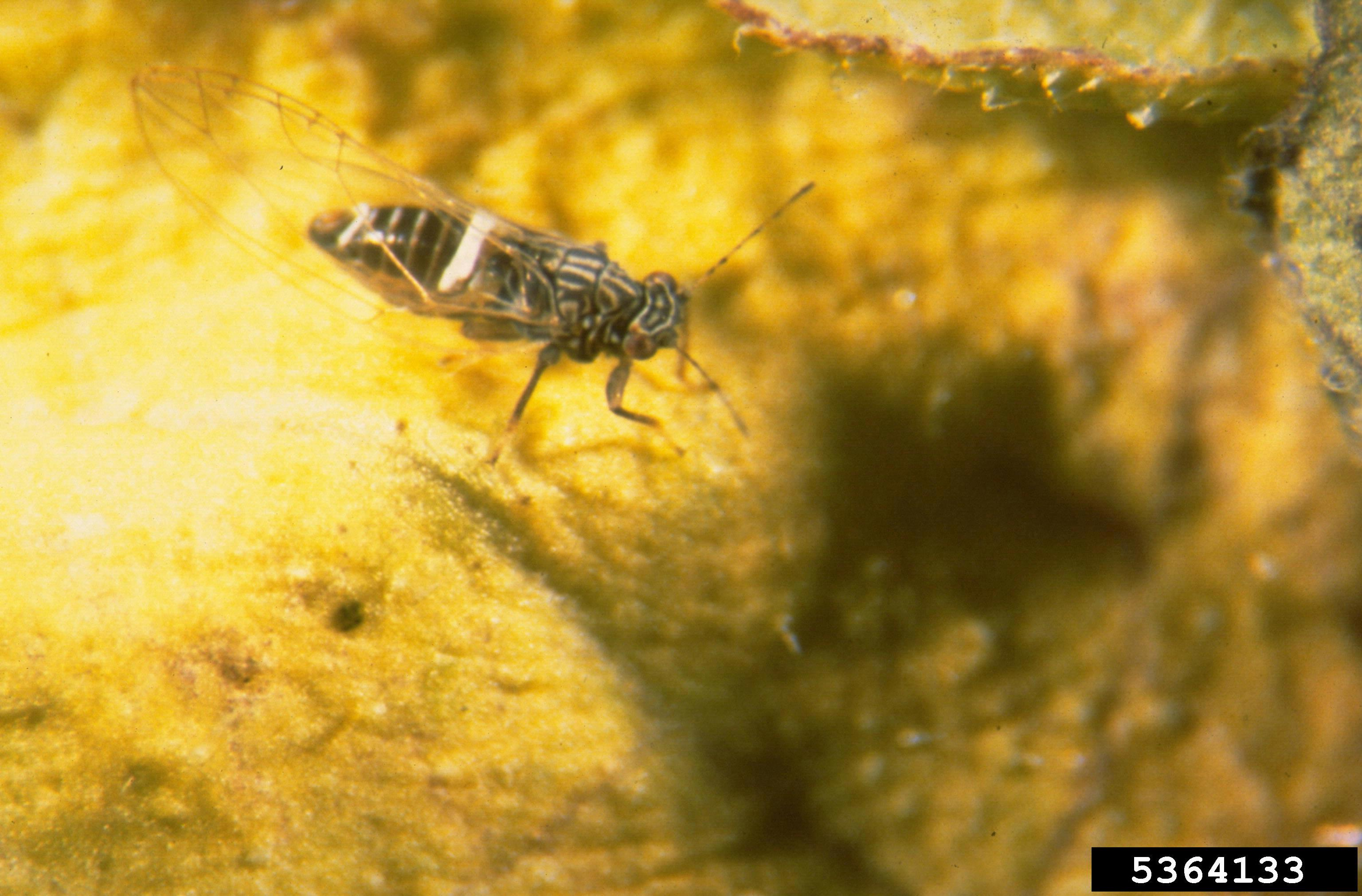
- The potato psyllid, Bactericera cockerelli, feeds on a potato and infects it with "Candidatus Liberibacter solanacearum", the bacterium that causes zebra chip disease.

Scientific classification (Candidatus)
- Domain: Bacteria
- Kingdom: Pseudomonadati
- Phylum: Pseudomonadota
- Class: Alphaproteobacteria
- Order: Hyphomicrobiales
- Family: Rhizobiaceae
- Genus: Liberibacter; Fagen et al. 2014

Species
- See text.

Synonyms
- "Candidatus Liberibacter" Jagoueix et al. 1997

= Liberibacter =

Species of bacterium

Liberibacter is a genus of Gram-negative bacteria in the Rhizobiaceae family. Detection of the liberibacteria is based on PCR amplification of their 16S rRNA gene with specific primers. Members of the genus are plant pathogens mostly transmitted by psyllids. The genus was originally spelled Liberobacter.

Most importantly, Liberibacter is a causative agent of Huanglongbing disease (HLB) also known as citrus greening disease. Liberibacter is transmitted by two insects from Psyllidae family – Diaphorina citri in Asia, Brazil and Florida, and Trioza erytreae in Africa. The Asian HLB strain, "Candidatus Liberibacter asiaticus" is more heat tolerant, while the African strain, Candidatus Liberibacter africanus is asymptomatic at temperatures above 30 °C. Species of Liberibacter, infecting solanaceous plants has been identified and it was carried by another psyllid, a potato pest Bactericera cockerelli.

== Genomes ==
The genetic diversity within the genus is best expressed as the diversity across genomes. More than 60 genomes have been sequenced, ranging in size from 233 kb to about 1.5 MB, hence the genomes are small compared to most other bacteria. The smallest genome (Candidatus Liberibacter asiaticus strain SGCA1) encodes only 655 proteins, while the largest genome (Candidatus Liberibacter asiaticus Tabriz. 3) encodes 2174 proteins.

The small genome size is typical for pathogenic bacteria which often undergo genome reduction. This is due to adaptation to their host which often provides many nutrients, so that the parasite does not need genes to produce those nutrients itself.

== Pathogenicity ==
Liberibacter bacteria are carried in the hemolymph and salivary glands of psyllids. Since psyllids feed on sap, this provides bacteria the entry to phloem of the plant. They induce significant metabolic and regulatory changes that damage the plants transport system and affects plants defense systems. These impairments have downstream negative effects on citrus microbiome of the infected plants.

Since pathological Liberibacter cannot be cultivated outside of its vector or host, genetics, bacteria-vector and bacteria-plant interaction have not yet been thoroughly explored. Factors important for adaption and colonization or possible coevolution are not yet understood. Only in 2014 the accidental discovery of Liberibacter crescens in Babaco papaya (during a Papaya Bunchy Top Disease study), which can be cultured axenically, allowed researchers to establish the genus and provided a valuable model organism to study related HLB strains.

Liberibacter activates salicylic acid pathway in host, likely due to recognition of extracellular molecules such as lipopolysaccharides or flagella. Pathogen in turn likely mitigates the effects, because it encodes SA hydroxylase, that degrades salicylic acid. Liberibacteria were shown to affect the spread of vector, by influencing the flight frequencies and sexual attraction of D. citri. On the other hand, infection with Liberibacter causes higher mortality of D. citri adults, but not nymphs. Liberibacter is a part of the psyllid microbiota and co-existence with other bacteria likely has impact on the overall fitness of the insect, as well as outcome of the disease.

== Treatment ==
Primary strategy for HLB disease management is a vector control. Antimicrobial treatment can suppress Liberibacter species, however usage of broad spectrum antibiotics is inadvisable due to adverse environmental effects. Alternative treatments, such as heat therapy, i.e., incubation of plant at temperatures above 40 °C for several days, show varying effects. Another suggested alternatives include the use of compounds that alleviate disease symptoms and boost plants defense systems or reinforcing natural citrus microbiota in order to compete with Liberibacter species. Early detection of HLB positive trees and removal from the groves, and extensive control of psyllids are the crucial HLB management strategies.

== Species ==
Named species include:

- "Ca. Liberibacter africanus" corrig. Jagoueix et al. 1994 originated in Africa and is a causal agent of citrus greening disease, also known as huanglongbing, and vectored by the African citrus psyllid Trioza erytreae.
- "Ca. Liberibacter americanus" Teixeira et al. 2005 is a novel species from Brazil described in 2005 and associated with huanglongbing and vectored by the Asian citrus psyllid Diaphorina citri.
- "Ca. Liberibacter asiaticus" corrig. Jagoueix et al. 1994 originated in Asia and is a causal agent of huanglongbing, vectored by the Asian citrus psyllid D. citri.
- "Ca. Liberibacter brunswickensis" Morris et al. 2017 associated with the psyllid Acizzia solanicola on eggplant in Australia.
- Liberibacter crescens Fagen et al. 2014 was isolated from papaya growing in Puerto Rico.
- "Ca. Liberibacter europaeus" Raddadi et al. 2011 is a novel species described in 2010, found in pear trees, where it seems to cause no symptoms and is vectored by the psyllid, Cacopsylla pyri.
- "Ca. Liberibacter solanacearum" Liefting et al. 2009 is a causal agent of zebra chip disease in potatoes. It can also infect other economically important crops including tomatoes, carrot, parsely, parsnip, celery and chervil. There are at least ten haplotypes described within this species, designated LsoA, LsoB, LsoC, LsoD, LsoE, Lso F, LsoG, LsoH, LsoH(Con) and LsoU. Haplotypes A, B and F are associated with solanaceous plants (potatoes and tomato) and vectored by the potato tomato psyllid Bactericera cockerelli. Haplotypes C, D, E and H affect apiaceous crops (carrots, celery etc.). Haplotypes D and E are vectored by Bactericera trigonica. Haplotype C is vectored by Trioza apicalis. The vector for haplotype H is currently unknown. Haplotype U has been found in Urtica dioica (stinging nettle) and is vectored byTrioza urticae.
  - LsoA is also described as a species as "Ca. Liberibacter psyllidaureus" corrig. Hansen et al. 2008 or the misspelling Ca. L. psyllaurous. It is now considered synonymous as the 16S rRNA genes are identical. In addition to being a plant pathogen, LsoA also serves as an endosymbiont for the insect vector, by modifying tomato defenses in favor of itself and its vector.
- "Ca. Liberibacter ctenarytainae" Thompson et al. 2017 is vectored by Ctenarytaina fuchsiae. Its genome was announced under a different spelling, "Ca. Liberibacter ctenarytaina".
- "Ca. Liberibacter capsica" Kwak et al. 2021 is vectoed by Russelliana capsici.
