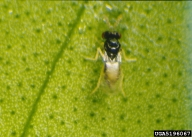

Scientific classification
- Kingdom: Animalia
- Phylum: Arthropoda
- Clade: Pancrustacea
- Class: Insecta
- Order: Hymenoptera
- Family: Eulophidae
- Genus: Tamarixia
- Species: T. radiata

Binomial name
- Tamarixia radiata (Waterston, 1922)

Synonyms
- Tetrastichus indicus Khan & Shafee, 1981; Tetrastichus radiatus Waterston, 1922

= Tamarixia radiata =

Species of wasp

Tamarixia radiata, the Asian citrus psyllid parasitoid, is a parasitoid wasp from the family Eulophidae which was discovered in the 1920s in the area of northwestern India (Punjab), now Pakistan. It is a parasitoid of the Asian citrus psyllid (Diaphorina citri), an economically important pest of citrus crops around the world and a vector for Citrus greening disease.

== Description ==
The adults of Tamarixia radiata are small, 0.92 to 1.04 mm long, black wasps. They have widely separated eyes, which are red in newly emerged adults, on a head which is slightly wider than its length, and transparent wings with pale yellow veins. There is marked sexual dimorphism, with the male antennae being one and a half times the length of female antennae. The antennae of the males have long and slightly curved setae while female antennae have short setae. The males are also slightly smaller than females in length and have smaller wings and darker abdomens. On the females, the ovipositor barely protrudes. In both males and females the head and thorax are shiny black and the posterior dorsal and lateral portions of the gastric segments are black and the vent and a patch on the anterior dorsal gaster are pale, sometime yellow. The legs are off white in colour.

== Distribution ==
Tamarixia radiata was initially described as Tetrastichus radiatus in 1922 by the British entomologist James Waterston from specimens collected in 1921 from part of the Punjab which is now in Pakistan. The natural range of T. radiata extends from Yemen and Saudi Arabia in the west to China and Indonesia in the east. When it was reported that this species was a highly efficient parasitoid of Diaphorina citri on the French Mascarene island of Réunion, it was spread around the world to control its host. T. radiata has since been introduced or spread to Argentina, Brazil, Colombia, Guadeloupe, Mauritius, Mexico, Philippines, Taiwan, Vietnam, Puerto Rico and the United States.

== Biology ==
Tamarixia radiata is an idiobiont ectoparasitoid of Diaphorina citri. The female wasp lays one or occasionally two eggs on the underside of a nymph of its host, between the third pair of legs. Even if two eggs are laid beneath a nymph, only one adult wasp will result, so T. radiata is a solitary parasitoid. One adult female T. radiata can lay up to 300 eggs in her life. On hatching the larvae attach themselves to the host and begin to feed on its haemolymph which eventually results in the death of the host. The newly hatched larvae are about 0.28mm long and 0.11mm wide. Larvae go through four instars and reach 0.14 mm long and 0.59 mm wide in their fourth instar. In the later stages of its growth, the larval T. radiata will have totally excavated the body cavity of the host nymph. The nymph's body turns a dark brown colour and becomes "mummified". The T radiata pupa extrudes silk which is used to adhere the excavated host's body to the twig where the nymph was feeding and sometimes the silk can be seen around a nymph with a T. radiata pupa within The larvae then pupates within the remains of the host and the adult wasp emerges through a hole, visible to the naked eye, in the nymph's thorax or head. The wasps will parasitise any age of host nymph but prefer the fifth instar nymphs. Under laboratory conditions, the development time from oviposition to the emergence of the adult from the host can take 11.4 days.

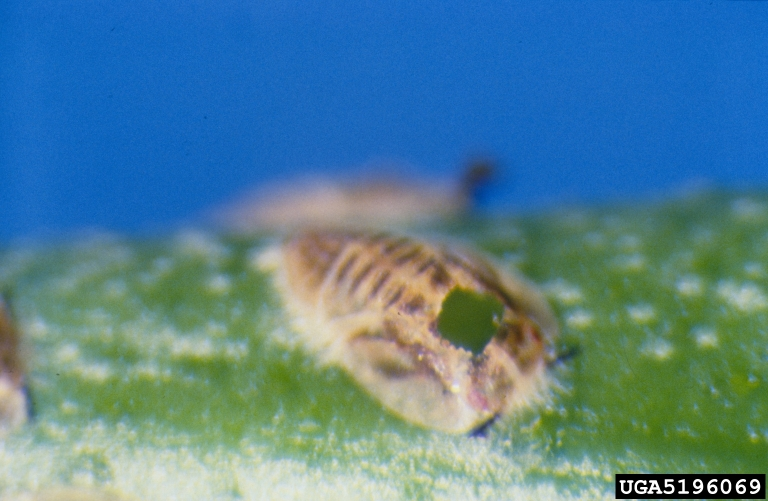
Tamarixia radiata emergence hole in mummified host nymph

Adult female T. radiata live on average for 23.6 days while the shorter-lived males have an average longevity of 11.4 days. The males are polygynous but the females normally mate once and mating does not affect longevity. The females mate on emergence, or at least within a day, and most mate only once. There are normally 1.8 females for every 3.2 males, but the sex ratio varies depending on the origin of the colony and conditions the wasps are reared under. As well as parasitizing the nymphs of its host adult female T. radiata are known to obtain protein for egg laying by feeding on the haemolymph of D. citri nymphs which they obtain by puncturing the nymph's skin with their ovipositor. It is thought that one female T. radiata may kill up to 500 nymphs of D. citri in her lifetime by a combination of parasitism and predation. Both the male and the female wasps have also been recorded feeding on the honeydew excreted by D. citri. Although adults of T. radiata are attracted to fluorescent lights it is thought that the females detect host through olfactory cues. Experiments having shown that female wasps are attracted to the volatile chemicals emitted by the nymphs of D. citri while males are attracted to the volatiles emitted by female T. radiata. It has also been found that female T. radiata avoid laying eggs in nymphs which have already been parasitized, unless there is a shortage of nymphs in which case superparasitism may occur.

== Use as a biological control ==
Tamarixia radiata is an obligate ectoparasitoid of the Asian citrus psyllid (Diophorina citri) which is a pest of citrus crops, the type specimen was collected from D. citri attacking lemon leaves. D. citri is one of the main vectors for the transmission of the bacterial infection citrus greening disease to citrus trees, a disease which can devastate citrus orchards and which had been known in China since the 19th Century. In the early part of the 20th century it began to be recorded in new areas in Asia and Africa and in the 1950s psyllids were shown to be vectors of the disease. In the early 2000s the disease was found in Brazil and Florida. In the early 1960s both T. radiata and the encyrtid Diaphorencyrtus aligarhensis, another parasitoid of D. cirti were introduced to Réunion where they successfully controlled populations of their host and reduced the impact of the disease. In a survey conducted on Réunion showed that T. radiata had parasitized up to about 70% of the potential host nymphs, while D. aligarhensis had parasitized less than 20%.

Once the disease appeared in Florida colonies of T. radiata were imported from Taiwan and Vietnam and released between 1999 and 2001 and it appears to have been at least partially successful at establishing itself. It has also been recorded in Puerto Rico and Texas where no known deliberate releases have taken place. Its effectiveness in suppressing its host populations in Florida has been variable. This is probably due to the differences in climate from their places of origin and predation by coccinellid beetles on psyllids (consuming many that were playing host to T. radiata).

In California colonies of T. radiata were bred from specimens captured in the Punjab as the climate there was thought to be closest to that of southern California. The wasps have been recovered some months after the initial release suggesting that they have bred in the wild and are capable of forming self-sustaining populations. The wasps have also been found up to 65 miles from the release sites showing that they will disperse. The project is run by University of California Riverside and the insects bred by them show wider genetic variability than T. radiata elsewhere, reflecting the careful sourcing and selection of the founder specimens.

The release of Tamarixia radiata for biological control of D. citri in California has potentially been affected by ants, especially the Argentine ant. Ants guard the nymphs of various bugs in return for a reward of honeydew. Ants have been observed to capture and consume Tamarixia wasps they encounter among clumps of D. citri nymphs as well as chasing the wasps away from the nymphs if they were unable to catch them. When D. citri populations are tended by ants then control of the ants may be necessary if the parasitoids are to control the psyllids. In addition, it is possible that the use of insecticides could affect the populations and rates of parasitism of D. citri by T. radiata so an effective integrated pest management program would involve the use of selective insecticides or pesticides harmful to the adult wasps, as long as the adult are not part of a self-sustaining population or that the application of the pesticide does not coincide with releases of adult wasps.
