= Potato mop-top virus =

Virus classification
- (unranked): Virus
- Realm: Riboviria
- Kingdom: Orthornavirae
- Phylum: Kitrinoviricota
- Class: Alsuviricetes
- Order: Martellivirales
- Family: Virgaviridae
- Genus: Pomovirus
- Species: Pomovirus solani

Species of virus

Potato mop-top virus (PMTV) is a plant pathogenic virus transmitted through the vector Spongospora subterranea that affects potatoes. PMTV belongs to family of Virgaviridae, and the genus Pomovirus (Potato mop-top virus). The virus was first identified in 1966 by Calvert and Harrison in Britain, and is now reported in many other potato cultivating regions of the world including Canada, China, Pakistan, Japan, Tasmania, the United States, some South American countries and many parts of Europe. Many disease management systems have been found to be ineffective against the virus, although a combination of sanitation and vector controls seems to work well.

== Hosts and symptoms ==
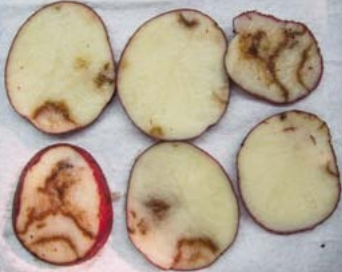
Tuber flesh

As the name implies, the main host is potato; however, this virus also affects some common vegetable plants and weeds. Some of them include tomato, black nightshade, lambsquarters and ground cherry. The potato mop top virus' primary hosts are plants in the Solanaceae and Chenopodiaceae. Potatoes that are infected by PMTV generally show hollow necrotic spots on the inside. This virus shows different symptoms in Europe; for example, the infected plants usually show dark brown necrotic arcs that discolor the tuber's flesh (these symptoms are very similar to those caused by alfalfa mosaic virus). Plants showing no symptoms of PMTV tend to produce larger quantities of infected tubers if they are derived from plants that have shown foliar symptoms in the previous year.

== Disease cycle ==
The spores that PMTV is vectored in can live in the soil for up to 18 years giving the virus a long period of survival. The critical period for infection of S. subterranea and consequently PMTV is earlier in the potato growth cycle, during stolon formation and tuber set, which lasts 3–4 weeks. The disease cycle of PMTV begins with the virus entering the host plant's cell and disassembling its capsid to release the viral RNA into the cell. As a pomovirus, PMTV uses the host plant's machinery for replication and translation which both follow positive-stranded RNA models. After replicates of the viral RNA and of the capsid proteins are made in the cytosol, the virus reassembles itself and exits the cell to infect other cells. Because it is vectored by a protist, it generally appears in cooler and more moist times of the year.

The naturally occurring virus has been found to have systemic effects on Nicotiana benthamiana. However, when the gene for TRIPLE GENE BLOCK1 (TGB1), which is a movement factor protein, was silenced, the systemic movement of the virus was hindered. The virus moves through the xylem to infect plants systemically, but can also spread locally through cell-to-cell movement. In host plants, the infected tissues include both leaves and the cytoplasm. It has been shown that PMTV infected seeds are planted, they only partially infect the following generations of plants, showing that its vector, S. subterranea is very important for transmission.

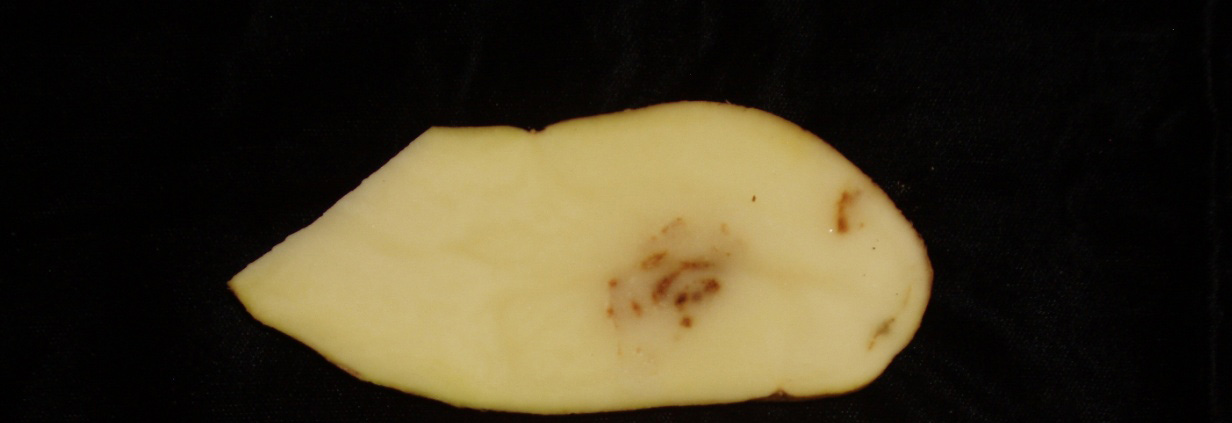
Potato Mop Top Virus

== Environment ==
The vector for PMTV, S. subterranea, is a slime mold known to cause powdery scab disease that favors wet and humid conditions, specifically poorly drained soil. In fact, this disease doesn't occur often in areas with less than 30 inches of rain per year. The chance of disease onset increases in areas that get more than 45 inches of rain per year. Such moist environments helps facilitate the vector's zoospore movement to the infection sites (roots and tubers). It is thought that powdery scab disease development increases when high soil moisture gradually dries out, as this increases zoospore germination. S. subterranea tends to prefer more acidic soil, ranging from pHs of 4.7 to 7.6. S. subterranea thrives in temperate conditions, between 52 and 75 degrees Fahrenheit, with the optimal temperature for infection by the vector being 60 degrees.

Disease development can also be encouraged by certain agricultural practices. For example, increased use of nitrate or ammonium nitrogen containing fertilizers increases the incidence and severity of powdery scab disease, caused by the PMTV vector S. subterranea . This can be due to the fact that fertilization enhances root growth, which provides a larger amount of tissue that can be infected.

== Management ==
Chemical treatments for field application against viruses are currently not available. This holds especially true for potatoes, because once infected by a virus, they will stay infected for the remainder of their lives. Thus, preventative methods are more viable options. This includes methods such as resistance-breeding, vector management, and crop sanitation.

Resistance-breeding, or generating plants that are genetically resistant to pathogen infections, is another option being explored. Generating vector-resistant plants have been proven to be largely unsuccessful for PMTV. This is because plants need to have immunity towards S. subterranea in its tubers, roots, and stolons in order to completely resist infection by the vector and virus. To this date, however, potatoes have been produced with resistant tubers but susceptible roots. Although resistance breeding has not yet provided benefits for commercially available PMTV varieties, there have been some promising results in ongoing research. There are some partially resistant varieties of commercial crop that are available now. An example is NY99, a breeding line that has shown a low incidence of PMTV-infected tubers. Resistance-breeding, if successful, would prevent the virus from starting its pathogenesis.

Vector management concentrates its efforts to reduce the level of S. subterranea in the soil as a way to combat the virus. Soil treatments, such as fungicides containing fluazinam, have been shown to be partially effective at reducing numbers of viable S. subterranea spores available to germinate into zoospores. Another form of vector management is crop rotations with brassicas and datura (a weed). Rotating with these plants has shown to produce low levels of S. subterranea in the soil.

Proper crop sanitation is achieved by planting certified seed potatoes. It is crucial that these seed potatoes come from production areas that have had no previous contact with either the vector or the virus itself. Further risk reduction can be achieved by properly sanitizing all machinery that has come in contact with soil and plant debris.

== Importance ==
PMTV is a relatively new discovery, having first been reported in Britain in 1966, and then in the U.S. in 2002. The vector S. subterranea, however, has been around for over 150 years, being first discovered in Germany in 1841. It was first discovered in the U.S. in 1913.

PMTV can lead to a very significant loss in the yield of potatoes. For example, a study conducted on Scottish seed potatoes showed a yield reduction as great as 67%. The virus also causes spraing and necrosis in the flesh of tubers. These symptoms are mainly morphological defects that yield unaesthetic potatoes which face commercial rejection from processors and packers. If potatoes exported to other countries are found to be infected, it can negatively affect agricultural trading. For example, Maine was quarantined due to its fairly recent outbreaks. In addition to economic losses, the presence of PMTV can also negatively impact the reputation of a country (or region, state, or farm) for other exports.

== Genome ==
PMTV is a (+)ssRNA virus with a tripartite genome. The longest segment of PMTV, RNA-rep encodes RNA dependent RNA polymerase and replicase subunits. The second segment, RNA-CP codes for virus coat protein (CP), and CP-RT or minor CP, which is produced by translational read-through of the CP stop codon. The third segment, RNA-TGB encodes triple gene block of movement proteins, TGB1, TGB2, TGB3, and 8K protein which is a viral suppressor of RNA silencing.

== Pathogenesis ==
The vector for PMTV is a protist, S. subterranea. As S. subterranea infects the roots of potatoes, the virus is given access to the root cells and starts its habitation of the plant. By taking control of the cell's cellular machinery, the virus can replicate. The virus then moves onto more potato cells and spreads systemically through the plant. The systemic movement of PMTV is facilitated in large by a protein named TRIPLE GENE BLOCK1 (TGB1) which has an internal domain spurring transportation of the virus to neighboring cells, and an N-terminal domain used for long-distance (systemic) travel. This N-terminal domain of TGB1 has shown some promise as a target to limit systemic infection of the pathogen in N. benthamiana, since systemic infection requires an interaction between a molecule called importin-a within the host plant and the N-terminal domain. Of the three positive-sense RNA molecules used by PMTV, there is one thought to code for a virulence factor protein. The other two molecules code for a polymerase and a coat protein both of which are necessary for the survival of the virus. RNA-TGB is a gene with 4 open reading frames (ORFs); the first three overlapping ORFs form an area called the triple gene block. This 3 frame block codes for essential movement factor proteins that facilitate cell-to-cell movement. The fourth ORF codes for another cysteine-rich protein that increases virulence and has some RNA silencing suppressive activity.

== See also ==
- Viral diseases of potato
