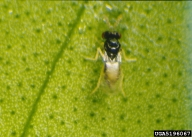
- Tamarixia radiata

Scientific classification
- Kingdom: Animalia
- Phylum: Arthropoda
- Clade: Pancrustacea
- Class: Insecta
- Order: Hymenoptera
- Family: Eulophidae
- Subfamily: Tetrastichinae
- Genus: Tamarixia; Mercet, 1924

Type species
- Tamarixia bicolor Mercet, 1924

Species
- See text

= Tamarixia =

Genus of wasps

Tamarixia is a genus of hymenopteran insects of the family Eulophidae, they are parasitoids of Jumping plant lice or psyllids of the superfamily Psylloidea, although some species will parasitise aphids. Most species appear to be ectoparasitoids but at least one species has been recorded as an endoparasitoid.

== Species ==
Tamarixia contains the following species:

- Tamarixia actis (Walker, 1839)
- Tamarixia akkumica (Kostjukov, 1978)
- Tamarixia arboreae (Graham, 1979)
- Tamarixia asiatica Kostjukov, 1996
- Tamarixia atamiensis (Ashmead, 1904)
- Tamarixia bicolor Mercet, 1924
- Tamarixia brovni Kostjukov, 2000
- Tamarixia caillardiae (Kostjukov, 1978)
- Tamarixia cometes (Girault, 1915)
- Tamarixia dahlsteni Zuparko, 2011
- Tamarixia dhetysaicus Kostjukov, 1996
- Tamarixia dryi (Waterston, 1922)
- Tamarixia dwivarnus Narendran, 2007
- Tamarixia dyra (Burks, 1943)
- ?Tamarixia erytreae
- Tamarixia flavicoxae Kostjukov, 2000)
- Tamarixia flavigaster (Brothers & Moran, 1969)
- Tamarixia flaviventris (Kostjukov, 1978)
- Tamarixia fulvus Yefremova & Yegorenkova, 2009
- Tamarixia girishi Narendran, 2007
- Tamarixia hanca Kostjukov, 2000
- Tamarixia klarisae Kostjukov, 1996
- Tamarixia krascheninnikovi (Kostjukov, 1990)
- Tamarixia leptothrix Graham, 1991
- Tamarixia leucaenae Boucek, 1988
- Tamarixia meteora (Girault, 1915)
- Tamarixia monesus (Walker, 1839)
- Tamarixia newelskoyi (Kostjukov, 1990)
- Tamarixia nocturna Kostjukov, 2000
- Tamarixia orientalis Khan, Agnihotri & Sushil, 2005
- Tamarixia pallicornis (Walker, 1872)
- Tamarixia poddubnyi (Kostjukov, 1978)
- Tamarixia pojarkovi (Kostjukov, 1990)
- Tamarixia pookodica Narendran, 2007
- Tamarixia pronomus (Walker, 1839)
- Tamarixia przewalskii (Kostjukov, 1990)
- Tamarixia psyllae Yefremova & Yegorenkova, 2009
- Tamarixia pubescens (Nees, 1834)
- Tamarixia pygmaeola (Erdos, 1958)
- Tamarixia radiata (Waterston, 1922)
- Tamarixia rudolfae (Kostjukov, 1978)
- Tamarixia schina Zuparko, 2011
- Tamarixia sheebae Narendran, 2005
- Tamarixia stelleri (Kostjukov, 1990)
- Tamarixia tremblayi (Domenichini, 1965)
- Tamarixia triozae (Burks, 1943)
- Tamarixia tschirikovi (Kostjukov, 1990)
- Tamarixia turundaevskayae (Kostjukov, 1978)
- Tamarixia upis (Walker, 1839)
- Tamarixia vinokurovi Kostjukov, 1995
- Tamarixia yoorica Narendran, 2007
