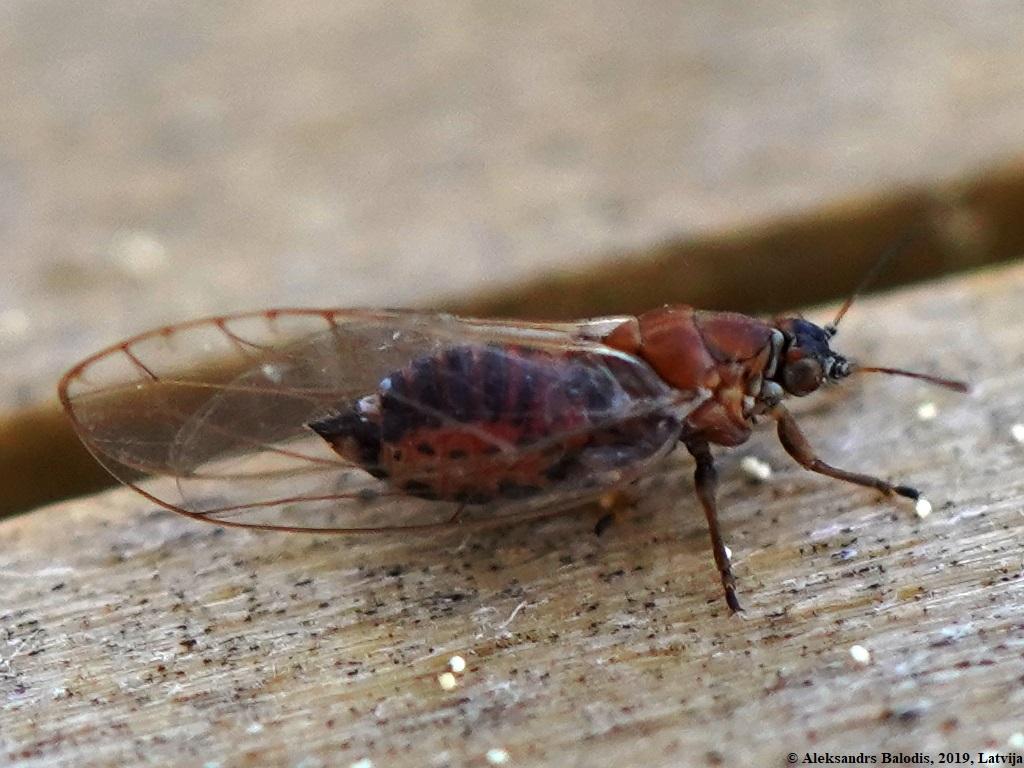

Scientific classification
- Domain: Eukaryota
- Kingdom: Animalia
- Phylum: Arthropoda
- Class: Insecta
- Order: Hemiptera
- Suborder: Sternorrhyncha
- Family: Triozidae
- Genus: Bactericera
- Species: B. albiventris

Binomial name
- Bactericera albiventris (Förster, 1848)

Synonyms
- Trioza albiventris Förster, 1848

= Bactericera albiventris =

Species of true bug

Bactericera albiventris is a hemipteran bug in the family Triozidae, which causes galls on the leaves of willows (Salix species). It was first described by Arnold Förster in 1848.

== Description of the gall ==
The gall is a small dimple (< 3 mm) on the underside of a willow leaf. Inside is a flat nymph which is surrounded with wax. The gall is raised on the upper surface of the leaf. If there is a heavy infestation, leaves (especially younger ones) may curl.

The galls are found on almond willow (Salix triandra), Babylon willow (S. babylonica), bay willow (S. pentandra), common osier (S. viminalis), crack willow (S. fragilis), eared willow (S. aurita), olive willow (S. elaeagnos), purple willow (S. purpurea) and white willow (S. alba).

== Distribution ==
Bactericera albiventris has been recorded from western Europe.
