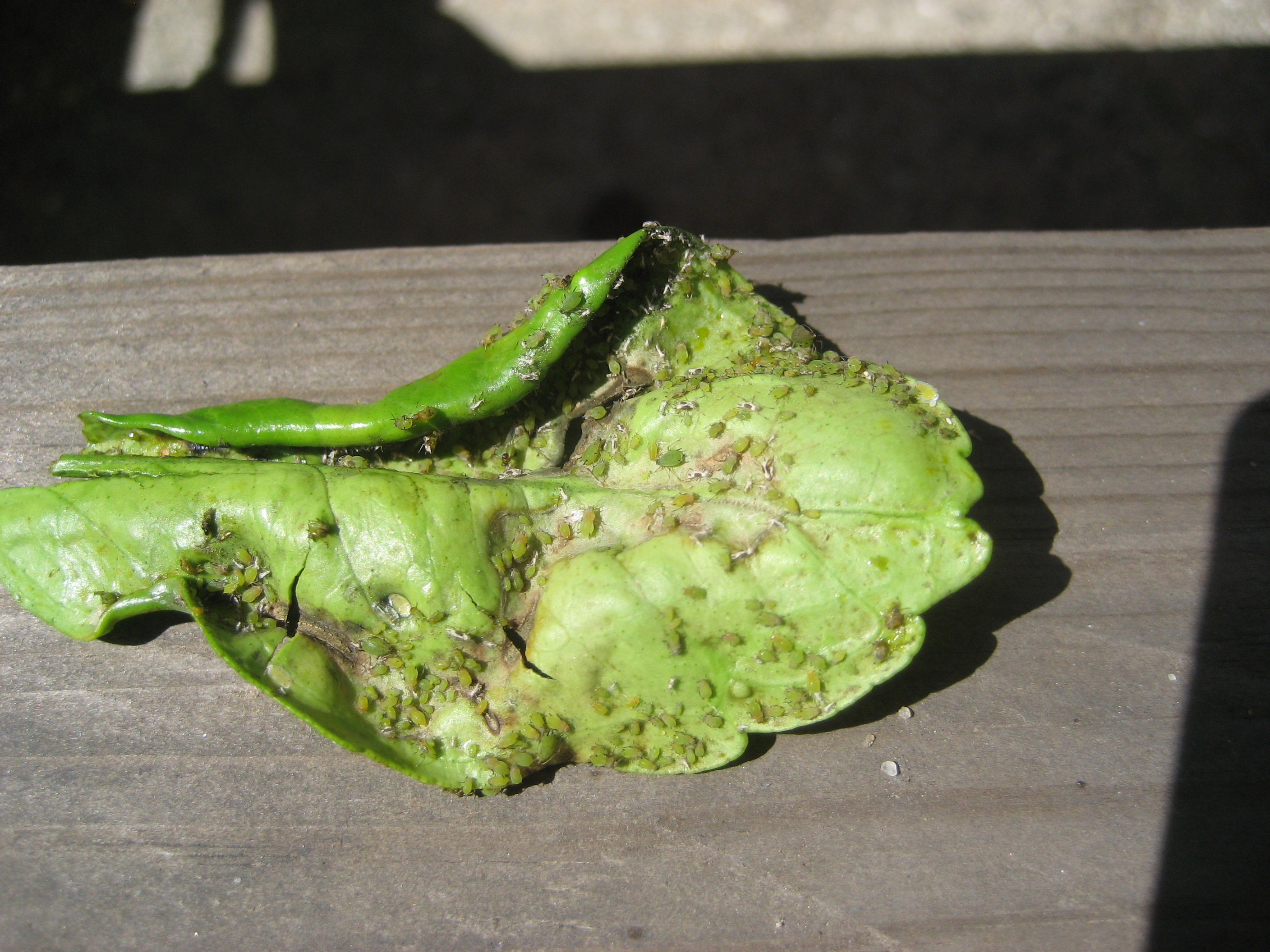
- Infestation of T. erytreae nymphs and aphids in orange tree leaf

Scientific classification
- Kingdom: Animalia
- Phylum: Arthropoda
- Clade: Pancrustacea
- Class: Insecta
- Order: Hemiptera
- Suborder: Sternorrhyncha
- Family: Triozidae
- Genus: Trioza
- Species: T. erytreae

Binomial name
- Trioza erytreae (Del Guercio, 1918)

= Trioza erytreae =

Species of true bug

Trioza erytreae, the African citrus psyllid, is a sap-sucking insect, a hemipteran bug in the family Triozidae. It is an important pest of citrus, being one of only two known vectors of the serious citrus disease, huanglongbing or citrus greening disease. It is widely distributed in Africa. The other vector is the Asian citrus psyllid, Diaphorina citri.

== Distribution ==
The citrus psyllid is found in Cameroon, Comoros, the Congo, Eswatini, Ethiopia, Kenya, Madagascar, Malawi, Mauritius, Réunion, Rwanda, South Africa, St. Helena, Sudan, Tanzania, Uganda, Zambia, and Zimbabwe. It is also found in Saudi Arabia, Yemen, and the Macaronesian archipelagos of Madeira and the Canary islands. It is sensitive to hot, dry conditions and favours cool, moist areas 500 m above sea level. Recently it has been introduced into Spain through Galicia and Portugal. However, huanglongbing (citrus greening disease) has not been detected yet in these countries.

== Description ==
The adult psyllid is at first pale, but darkens later to a light-brown colour. The female is larger than the male and has a sharply pointed abdomen as compared to the male's blunt one. It typically adopts a distinctive stance when feeding, with head down sucking sap and body raised at an angle of about 35°.

== Lifecycle ==
Trioza erytreae is confined to host plants in the family Rutaceae. It occurs on wild plants such as horsewood and white ironwood, as well as on citrus, especially lemons and limes. A female psyllid can lay up to 2000 eggs over the course of a four- to seven-week period. Eggs are laid on the margins of new leaf growth and are anchored by short stalks. They hatch after 7 to 14 days, and the first-instar nymphs start to feed on the underside of the leaves where they begin to form galls. The feeding of a large number of nymphs causes curling of the leaves, distortion of shoots, and even cessation of growth. The nymphs moult five times before becoming winged adults. The nymphal development stage lasts between 20 and 40 days depending on temperature.

== Damage and control ==
Trioza erytreae is one of only two vectors of the causative agents of citrus greening disease, the phloem-restricted, Gram-negative bacterium Candidatus Liberibacter spp. The Asian form, L. asiaticus, is heat tolerant and symptoms of the disease can develop at temperatures up to 35 °C. The African form, L. africanum, is heat sensitive and symptoms only develop when the temperature is in the range 20–25 °C. Although T. erytreae is the natural vector of African citrus greening and D. citri the natural vector of Asian citrus greening, either psyllid can in fact transmit either of the greening agents under experimental conditions.

Associated with T. erytreae in Zimbabwe are two primary parasitoids and a number of secondary and tertiary hyperparasitoids. One of the primary parasitoids, Tetrastichus radiatus, remains external to the psyllid host, whereas the other, Psyllaephagus pulvinatus, is an internal parasitoid. The major secondary hyperparasitoid is Aphidencyrtus cassatus, which was recorded in large numbers and which attacks both of the primary parasitoids.
