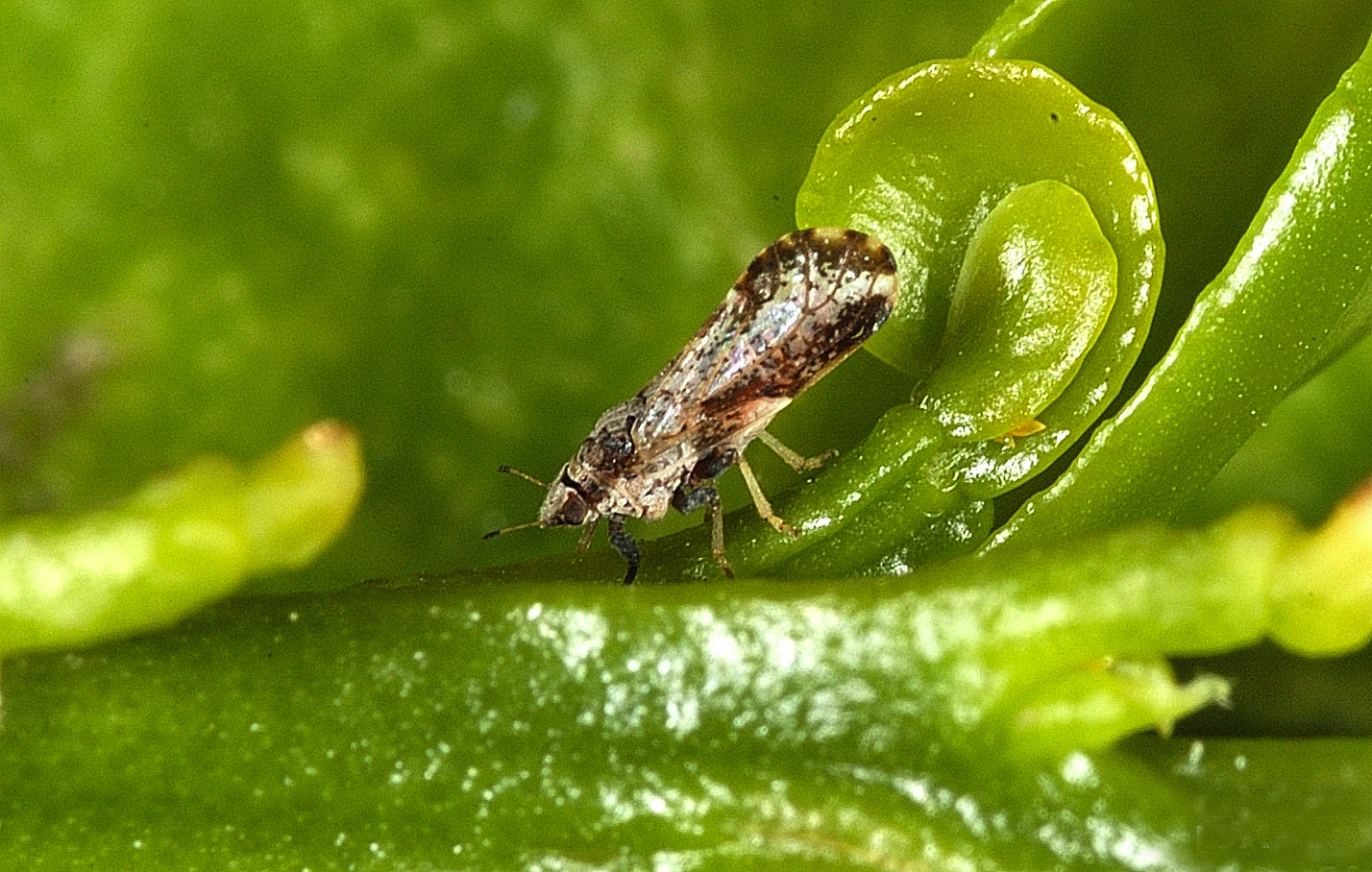
- Asian citrus psyllid, D. citri
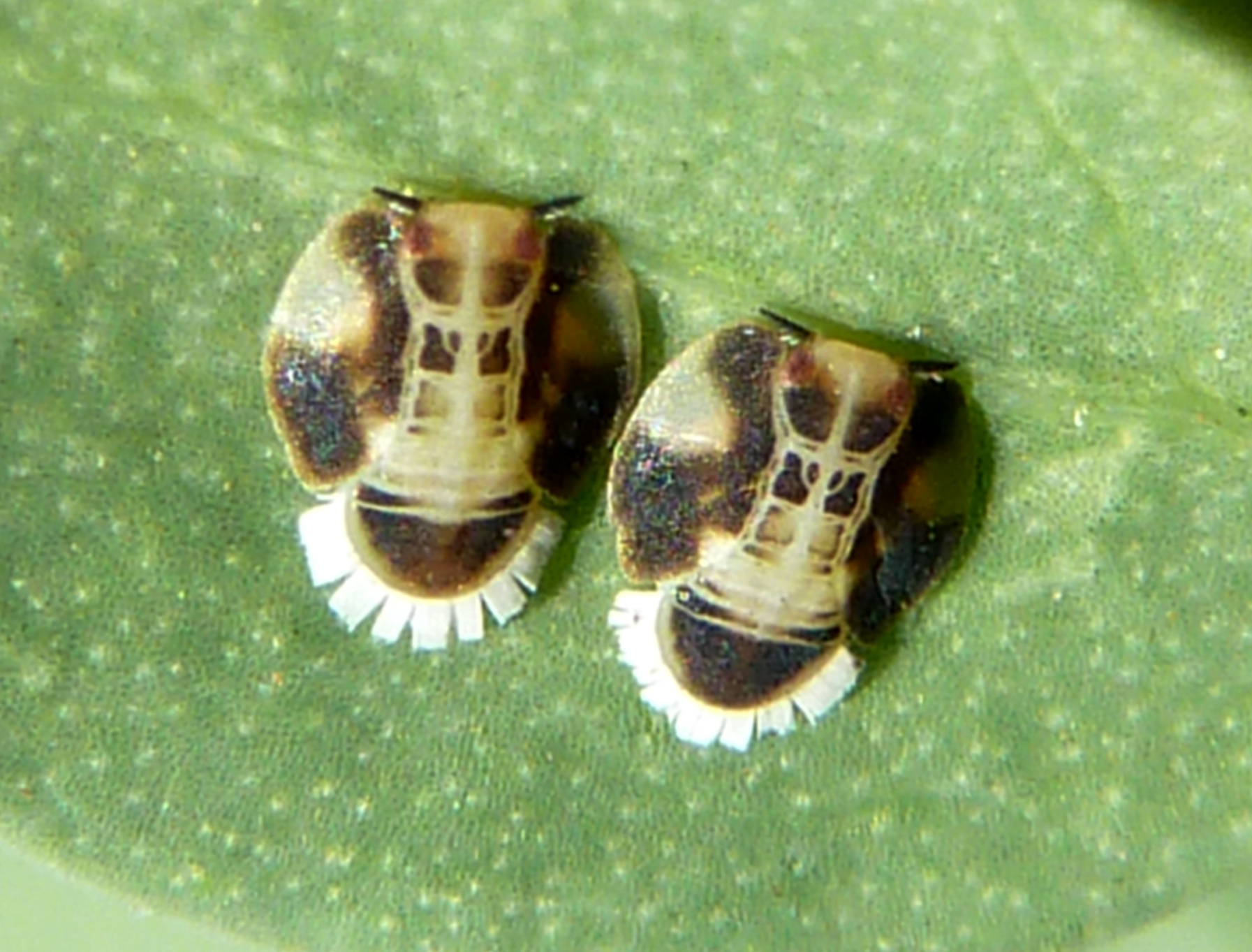
- nymphs on a Clutia leaf

Scientific classification
- Kingdom: Animalia
- Phylum: Arthropoda
- Clade: Pancrustacea
- Class: Insecta
- Order: Hemiptera
- Suborder: Sternorrhyncha
- Family: Psyllidae
- Subfamily: Diaphorininae
- Genus: Diaphorina; Löw, 1880

= Diaphorina =

Genus of true bugs

Diaphorina is an Old World genus of sap-sucking bugs, typical of the subfamily Diaphorininae. It includes an important pest of citrus: the Asian citrus psyllid, D. citri.

== Species ==
The genus contains around 70 species. The Catalogue of Life listed (in 2012):

- Diaphorina acokantherae
- Diaphorina aegyptiaca
- Diaphorina albomaculata
- Diaphorina amoena
- Diaphorina bicolor
- Diaphorina bikanerensis
- Diaphorina brevicornis
- Diaphorina brevigena
- Diaphorina carissae
- Diaphorina chobauti
- Diaphorina citri
- Diaphorina clutiae
- Diaphorina communis
- Diaphorina continua
- Diaphorina dakariensis
- Diaphorina dunensis
- Diaphorina elegans
- Diaphorina enderleini
- Diaphorina enormis
- Diaphorina ericae
- Diaphorina euryopsi
- Diaphorina fabulosa
- Diaphorina florea
- Diaphorina fusca
- Diaphorina guttulata
- Diaphorina gymnosporiae
- Diaphorina harteni
- Diaphorina helichrysi
- Diaphorina lamproptera
- Diaphorina leptadeniae
- Diaphorina linnavuorii
- Diaphorina loranthi
- Diaphorina luteola
- Diaphorina lycii
- Diaphorina minor
- Diaphorina multimaculata
- Diaphorina natalensis
- Diaphorina petteyi
- Diaphorina porrigogena
- Diaphorina punctipennis
- Diaphorina punctulata
- Diaphorina pusilla
- Diaphorina putonii
- Diaphorina quadramaculata
- Diaphorina rubra
- Diaphorina similis
- Diaphorina solani
- Diaphorina tenebrosa
- Diaphorina truncata
- Diaphorina tryoni
- Diaphorina typica
- Diaphorina valens
- Diaphorina venata
- Diaphorina virgata
- Diaphorina zebrana
