= Psyllid yellows =

Plant disease in potatoes

- Causal agents: Candidatus Liberibacter solanacearum
- Hosts: Potato
- Vectors: Bactericera cockerelli
- EPPO Code: LIBEPS
- Distribution: New Zealand

Psyllid yellows is a disease of potatoes infested by the potato/tomato psyllid, Bactericera cockerelli. The symptoms are a marked yellowing of the leaves, an upright appearance to the leaves, with severe cases resulting in early death of the plant. Tuber initiation and growth is affected. Many small tubers are formed, frequently misshaped. In some cases, the tubers seem to have lost sprouting inhibition and have begun sprouting before harvest. At later stages, the tubers sprout weakly, if at all.

It is thought that a toxin produced by the nymph stage of the psyllid causes these symptoms. If pest control occurs at an early stage of the disease, the plants appear to be able to recover.

A very similar disease has been described in tomatoes. In addition to the foliar symptoms, mature fruit is very much smaller, tends to have a pointy end, and frequently they occur in larger clusters of fruit than normal. In severe cases, the yellowing progresses to plant death. In addition to psyllid feeding, a new species of bacterium 'Candidatus Liberibacter solanacearum' has been associated with this disease. Capsicum crops show a similar fruit effect, but generally with no, or very little, foliar symptom.

A summary of symptoms from plants in New Zealand with photos of tomato and capsicum plants:

- Symptoms in tomato plants: Include leaf curling and yellowing stunting of the plant, fruit occasionally misshapen with a strawberry like appearance. The leaf axial or stalk may also become very long and the fruit development may be uneven.
- Symptoms in capsicum plants: Include pale green or yellow leaves with spiky tips. Leaves may be misshapen. Leaf stalks may be misshapen, leaf stalks appear short, flowers may drop prematurely and parts of the plant may die back. Symptoms may vary in severity between varieties.
- Symptoms in potato tops can include these being smaller than normal, yellowing and the tops can develop a scorched appearance before premature collapse.

This same Liberibacter has recently been found in potatoes in New Zealand and in the US.

The potato disorder/disease "Zebra chip" is related in that 'Candidatus Liberibacter solanacearum' has been reported from Zebra Chip potatoes in both Texas and New Zealand.
