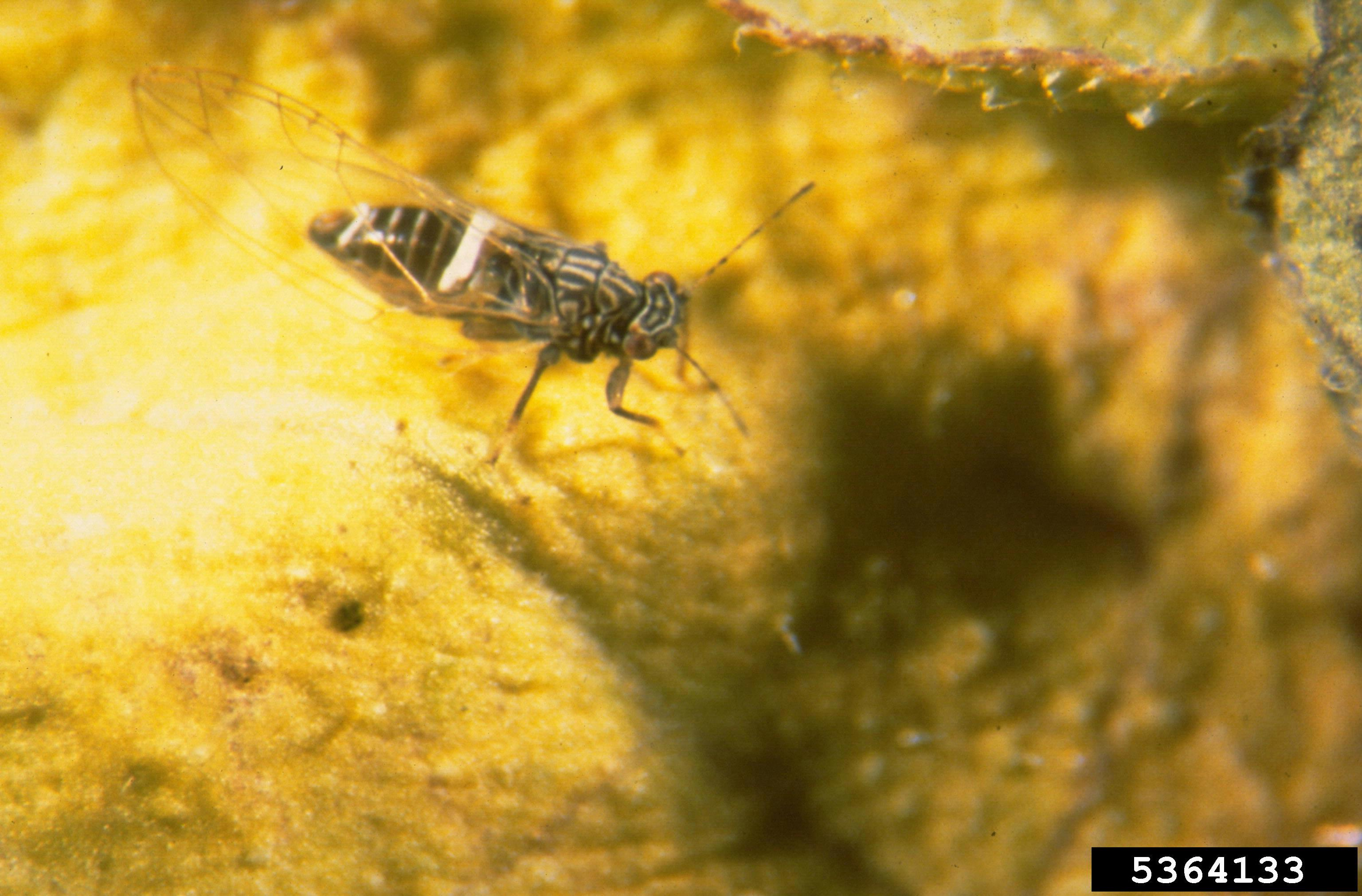
- Bactericera cockerelli, feeds on a potato and infects it with Candidatus Liberibacter solanacearum

Scientific classification
- Kingdom: Animalia
- Phylum: Arthropoda
- Clade: Pancrustacea
- Class: Insecta
- Order: Hemiptera
- Suborder: Sternorrhyncha
- Family: Triozidae
- Genus: Bactericera
- Species: B. cockerelli

Binomial name
- Bactericera cockerelli (Šulc, 1909)

= Bactericera cockerelli =

Species of true bug

Bactericera cockerelli, also known as the potato psyllid, is a species of psyllid native to southern North America. Its range extends from Central America north to the American Pacific Northwest and parts of Manitoba, in Canada. It is restricted to the western part of the continent. As its name suggests, it is commonly found on potato and tomato crops, but has a species range that encompasses over 40 species of solanaceous plants and as many as 20 genera. Breeding hosts are generally recognised as being restricted primarily to Solanaceae, including important crop and common weed species, and a few species of Convolvulaceae, including bindweed and sweet potato. On some plants, especially potato, feeding of the nymphs causes a condition called psyllid yellows, presumed to be the result of a toxin. Both nymphs and adults can transmit the bacterium Candidatus Liberibacter.

Zebra chip is a recently diagnosed disease of potatoes associated with psyllid infestation and caused by species of the gram-negative bacterium, Candidatus Liberibacter. The tubers frequently have discolouration which becomes more clear during frying of chips. This disease causes very significant losses to farmers when it occurs as the potatoes are not suitable for making them into chips or fries.

The pest has caused significant loss in potato yields during periods of major population increase. Maximum potato yield loss appears to be related to infestations occurring early in the growing season, or on crops with a significant leaf canopy by summer. The psyllids are not heat tolerant and it is thought they survive summer temperatures in crops with sufficient leaf canopy through summer to offer shade.

The nymphs are very small and inconspicuous, feeding on the underside of leaves. Both nymphs and adults feed in the phloem.

These psyllids have long been thought to migrate annually from the southern regions of North America northwards, but more recent evidence indicates distinct populations exist regionally.
