= Pomovirus =

Virus classification
- (unranked): Virus
- Realm: Riboviria
- Kingdom: Orthornavirae
- Phylum: Kitrinoviricota
- Class: Alsuviricetes
- Order: Martellivirales
- Family: Virgaviridae
- Genus: Pomovirus

Genus of viruses

Pomovirus is a genus of viruses, in the family Virgaviridae. Plants and dicotyledons serve as natural hosts. There are five species in this genus. Diseases associated with this genus include: dwarfing of shoots (mop-top) and potato spraing disease. The name of the genus is derived from Potato mop-top virus, giving rise to Pomovirus.

== Taxonomy ==
The following species are assigned to the genus, listed by scientific name and followed by their common names:

- Pomovirus betae, Beet virus Q
- Pomovirus colombiense, Colombian potato soil-borne virus
- Pomovirus solani, Potato mop-top virus
- Pomovirus solibetae, Beet soil-borne virus
- Pomovirus viciae, Broad bean necrosis virus

== Structure ==
Viruses in the genus Pomovirus are non-enveloped, with rod-shaped geometries, and helical symmetry. The diameter is around 21 nm, with a length of 245 nm. Genomes are linear and segmented. The three segments are about 6, 3.5, and 3kb in length.

Genus	Structure	Symmetry	Capsid	Genomic arrangement	Genomic segmentation
Pomovirus	Rod-shaped	Helical	Non-enveloped	Linear	Segmented

== Life cycle ==
Viral replication is cytoplasmic. Entry into the host cell is achieved by penetration into the host cell. Replication follows the positive stranded RNA virus replication model. Positive stranded RNA virus transcription is the method of transcription. Translation takes place by suppression of termination. The virus exits the host cell by tripartite non-tubule guided viral movement. Plants and dicotyledons serve as the natural host. The virus is transmitted via a vector (fungus). Transmission routes are vector.

Genus	Host details	Tissue tropism	Entry details	Release details	Replication site	Assembly site	Transmission
Pomovirus	Plants	None	Unknown	Viral movement	Cytoplasm	Cytoplasm	Mechanical inoculation: fungus
