= Spraing =

Disease of potatoes

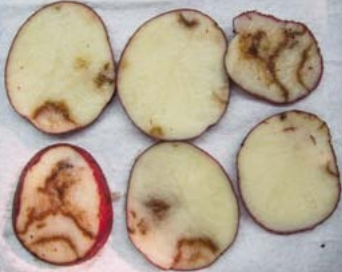
Brown marks from Potato mop-top virus

Spraing is a collective term for diseases and disorders of potato tubers that cause brown streaks in the flesh of the potato. Spraing can be caused by two viruses, tobacco rattle virus (TRV) which is transmitted by trichodorid nematodes, or Potato mop-top virus (PMTV) transmitted by the powdery scab fungus Spongospora subterranea. The two viruses may have synergistic effects in disease progression when both are present. Spraing like symptoms can also be caused by physiological defects or specific nutrient deficiencies, most notably Calcium.

Control of the disease is generally by ensuring that seed is disease free although the strain transmitted by nematodes can be controlled to some extent by the use of nematicides.

TRV spraing vectored by free living nematodes (trichodorid) most typically occurs on light sandy soils during incidence of heavy rain or over irrigation. These conditions are ideal for the nematodes to swim to the surface in order to feed on the tubers and subsequently cause infection. During non wet periods they return to the depths of the soil profile making soil sample testing for trichodorid often unreliable. Different potato varieties show varying levels of resistance to TRV tuber symptoms.

Thus avoiding using susceptible cultivars and careful irrigation management is often enough to avoid problematic symptoms. The resultant internal brown flecks can cause costly factory rejections for commercial growers due to loss of processed quality.
