= Auguste Puton =

French zoologist

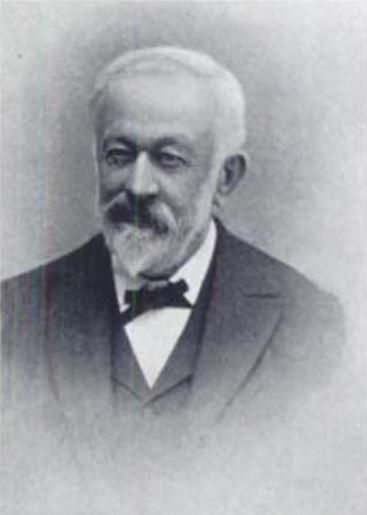
- Born: Jean Baptiste Auguste Puton; 1834; Remiremont, France
- Died: 1913 (aged 78–79); Remiremont, France
- Scientific career
- Author abbrev. (zoology): Puton, A.

Auguste Puton (born Jean Baptiste Auguste Puton 16 August 1834– died 8 April 1913) was a French zoologist, specialising in Heteroptera of the palearctic and in particular France. He published over 150 papers and a few catalogs. He described many new species, most of them are now owned by the National Museum of Natural History (France).

== Works ==
- Catalogue des hémiptères hétéroptères d'Europe / par A. Puton, .. / Paris : Deyrolle, 1869
- Catalogue des hémiptères-hétéroptères de L'Alsace et de Lorraine [Texte imprimé] / Ferdinand Reiber, A. Puton / Colmar : Decker C, 1876
- Catalogue des hémiptères-homoptères (cicadines et psyllides) de l'Alsace et de la Lorraine et Supplément au catalogue des hémiptères-hétéroptères / Ferdinand Reiber, A. Puton / Colmar : Decker C, 1880
- Synopsis des Hémiptères-Hétéroptères de France T. I, 3ème partie, Reduvides, Saldides, Hydrocorises / Auguste Puton / Paris : Deyrolle, 1880
