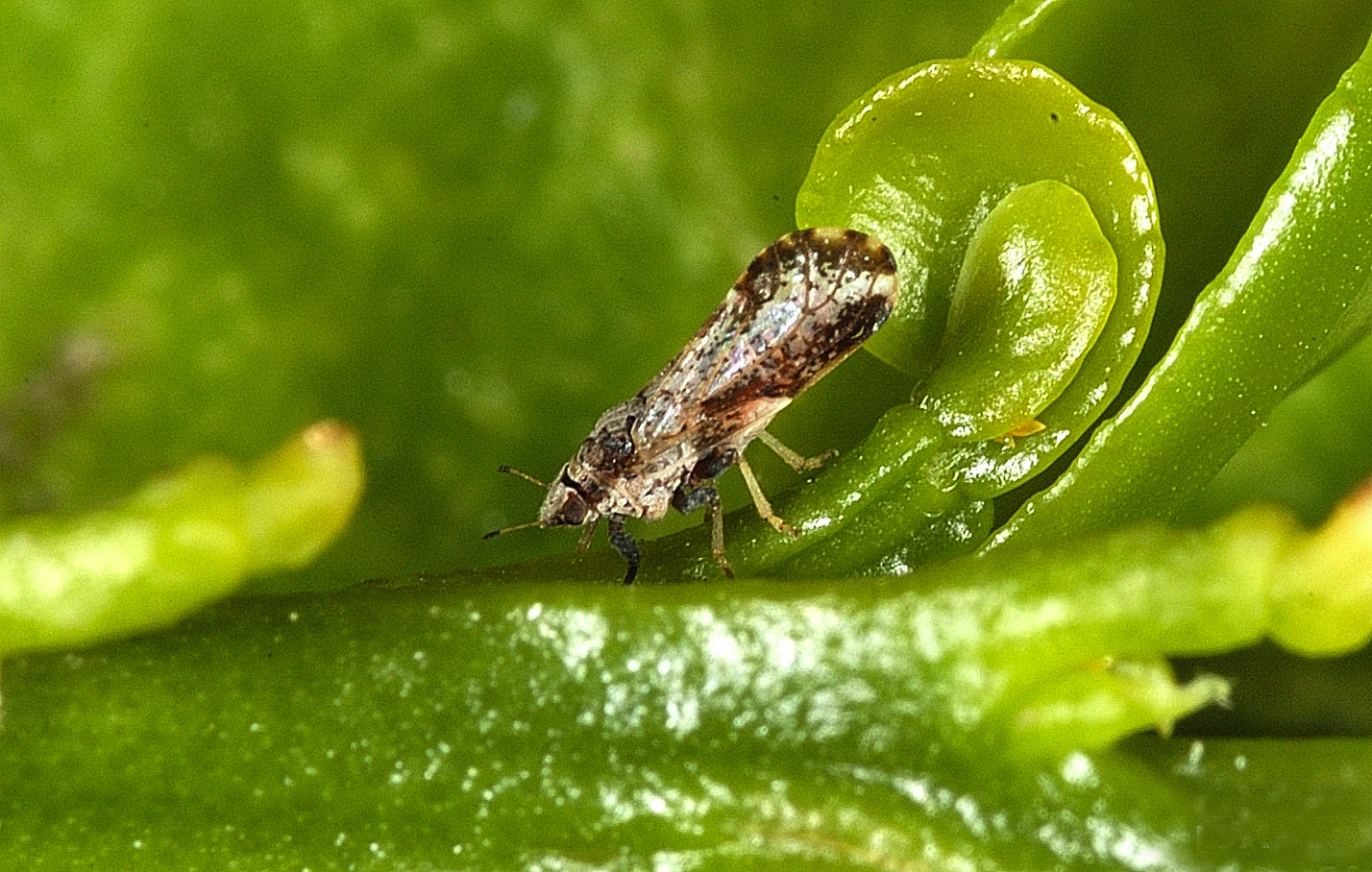
- Asian citrus psyllid, Diaphorina citri

Scientific classification
- Kingdom: Animalia
- Phylum: Arthropoda
- Clade: Pancrustacea
- Class: Insecta
- Order: Hemiptera
- Suborder: Sternorrhyncha
- Family: Psyllidae
- Genus: Diaphorina
- Species: D. citri

Binomial name
- Diaphorina citri Kuwayama, 1908

= Diaphorina citri =

Species of true bug

Diaphorina citri, the Asian citrus psyllid, is a sap-sucking, hemipteran bug now in the taxonomic family Liviidae. It is one of two confirmed vectors of citrus greening disease. It has a wide distribution in southern Asia and has spread to other citrus growing regions.

== Distribution ==
The Asian citrus psyllid originated in Asia but it is now also found in parts of the Middle East, South and Central America, Mexico, and the Caribbean. In the United States, the psyllid was first detected in Florida in 1998 and is now also found in Louisiana, Georgia, Arizona, South Carolina, Texas, and since 2003 in California. In Southern California, the San Joaquin Valley, and Central Coast counties, such as San Luis Obispo, an eradication program has been instituted in an attempt to prevent it from becoming established. In the whole of the United States and its territories, areas where this psyllid are found are under quarantine restrictions.

== Description ==
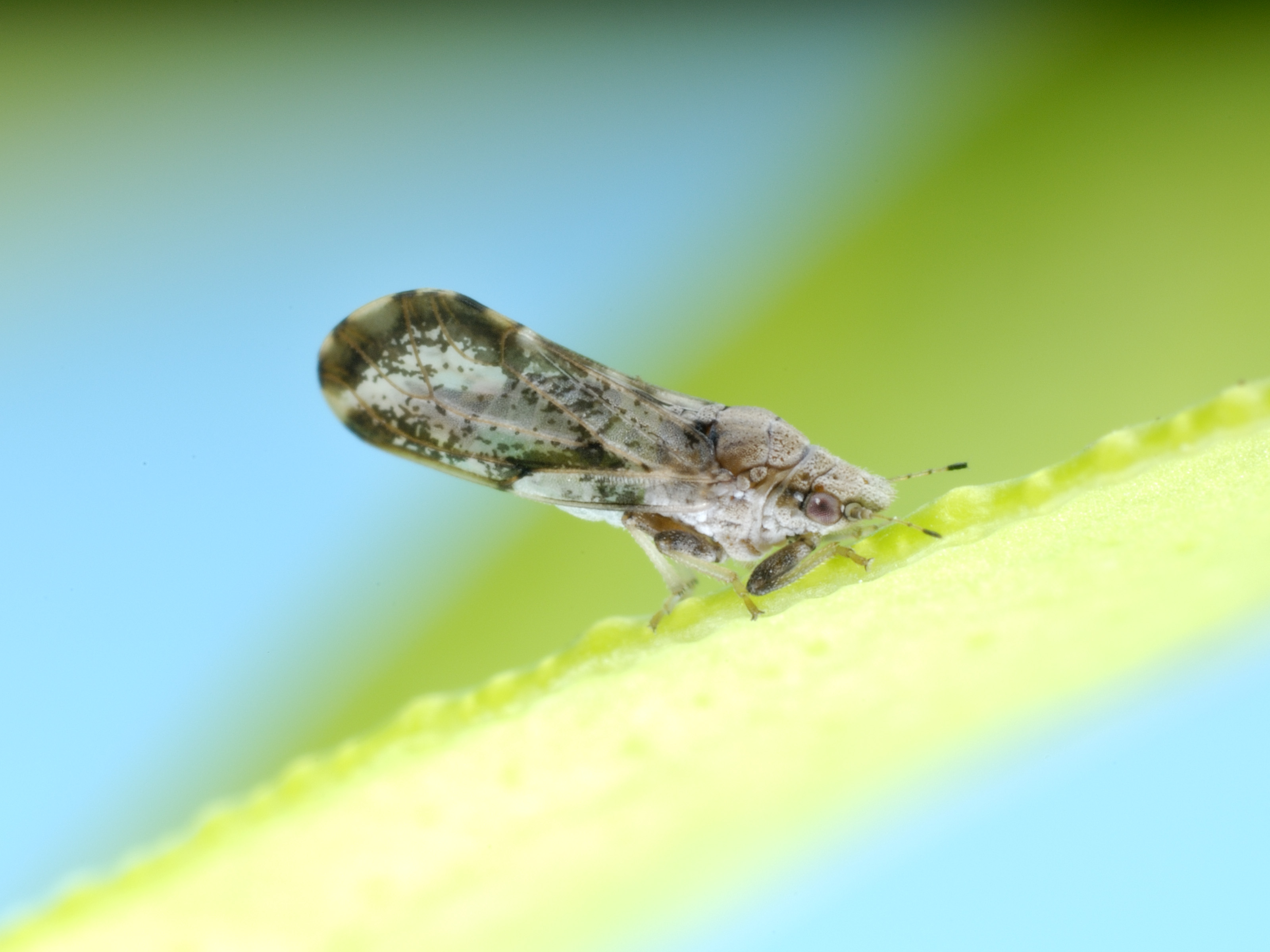
Adult D. citri

The adult psyllid is about four millimetres long with a fawn and brown mottled body and a light brown head. It is covered with a whitish, waxy secretion which makes it look dusty. The forewings are broadest at the back and have a dark edging around the periphery with a pale gap near the apex. The antennae are pale brown with black tips. These features distinguish it from the superficially similar African citrus psyllid. It typically adopts a head down, tail up posture as it sucks sap. Aphids are often also present on citrus and psyllids can be distinguished from them by being more active, jumping insects, whereas aphids are sedentary. In addition, the antennae of a psyllid has ten segments whereas those of aphids usually have four or six segments. Most aphids have cornicles on the abdomen and psyllids lack these.

The psyllid nymph moults five times. It is a yellowish-orange color and has no abdominal spots. The wing pads are prominent, especially in the later instars.

The eggs are approximately 0.3 millimeters long, almond-shaped, thicker at the base and tapering toward the top. They are at first a pale color but turn yellow and later orange before they hatch. The long axis is placed vertical to the surface of the leaf.

== Microbiome ==
The psyllid has a bacteriome organ specialized for carrying two of its bacterial symbionts. Candidatus Carsonella ruddii, which provides nutrition, lives inside uninuclear bacteriocytes around the organ. Ca. Profftella armatura, which provides nutrition, defense toxins, and carotenoids, lives inside the syncytial cytoplasm of the organ. Polyketide synthesis by the Profftella symbiont is increased when the insect is carrying the Huanglongbing pathogen Liberibacter.

Another insect of the same genus, Diaphorina cf. continua (open nomenclature term describing an unnamed species similar to Diaphorina continua), shares bacteriome symbionts.

The insect can be infected by Wolbachia, which is then transmitted vertically via the egg. Wolbachia and Liberibacter can reside either within the U-shaped bacteriome, or mingle with gut cells as part of the gut microbiome. Wolbachia is able to help Liberibacter survive bacteriophages by inhibiting cell lysis.

== Life cycle ==
Eggs are laid on the tips of growing shoots, between and near the unfolding leaves. A female may lay up to 800 eggs during her lifetime which may be several months. The whole development cycle takes from two to seven weeks depending on the temperature and the time of year.

=== International Psyllid Genome Consortium ===
The USDA-ARS, U.S. Horticultural Research Laboratory (USHRL), in Fort Pierce, FL, established the international Genome Consortium to complete the Asian Citrus Psyllid Genome (D. citri) in 2008. The USDA, ARS researchers produced the first gene sequences starting in 2005 and produced the first draft transcriptomes in 2009–2011, draft genomes 2013–2017, the improved Official Gene Set, OGSv2.0 and diaci_2.0 genome by 2019–2022. The release of the Diaci_genome version 3.0 occurred in 2023–2024 and was published in December 2024. The genome, transcriptome and Official Gene Set, have enabled the identification of thousands of genes and proteins. All these resources have enabled the development of broad strategic approaches to manage psyllid populations, like RNAi biopesticides. These datasets of interactions and tissues also provided new insights into the interactions of the bacterial pathogen Candidatus Liberibacter asiaticus, CLas, with psyllids, and the citrus host plants.

The major breakthroughs on psyllid management that were developed include three types of antisense oligonucleotides (double-stranded RNA, single stranded antisense oligos (like FANA and Morpholio's) that can target the Asian citrus psyllid, and the bacterial pathogen, without harming other beneficial insects, like pollinators and predators. Using the genomic data researchers developed the first RNA interference, RNAi, biopesticide to reduce psyllids.

== Predation ==
The predatory Brachygastra mellifica and parasitoid Tamarixia radiata wasps can both help control D. citri. Lady beetles are also important predators.

== Damage ==
Psyllid nymphs are found on new shoots of citrus trees. As they feed, they produce a toxin that causes the plant tips to die back or become contorted, preventing the leaves from expanding normally. However, direct damage from feeding by the psyllid is considered minor compared with the role the psyllid plays as the only known nonhuman vector of citrus greening disease.

=== Citrus greening disease and other associations ===
Feeding can vector bacteria that causes one of the most devastating of citrus diseases, citrus greening disease. Affected trees bear small, asymmetrical fruit which are partially green and which are unsellable because of their poor size and quality. There is laboratory evidence indicating it can also transmit another serious citrus disease caused by the Tristeza virus.

== Control ==
The Asian citrus psyllid has a number of natural enemies including hoverflies, lacewings, several species of ladybird and a number of species of parasitic wasp. One of these wasps, Tamarixia radiata, has proved very effective at controlling the pest and has been successfully released and become established in a number of citrus growing areas including Florida. Both adults and nymphs of the psyllid can be controlled by the use of a wide range of insecticides. Citrus greening disease is best controlled through an integrated strategy involving the use of healthy planting material, the control of vectors, and the prompt removal of infected trees and branches.

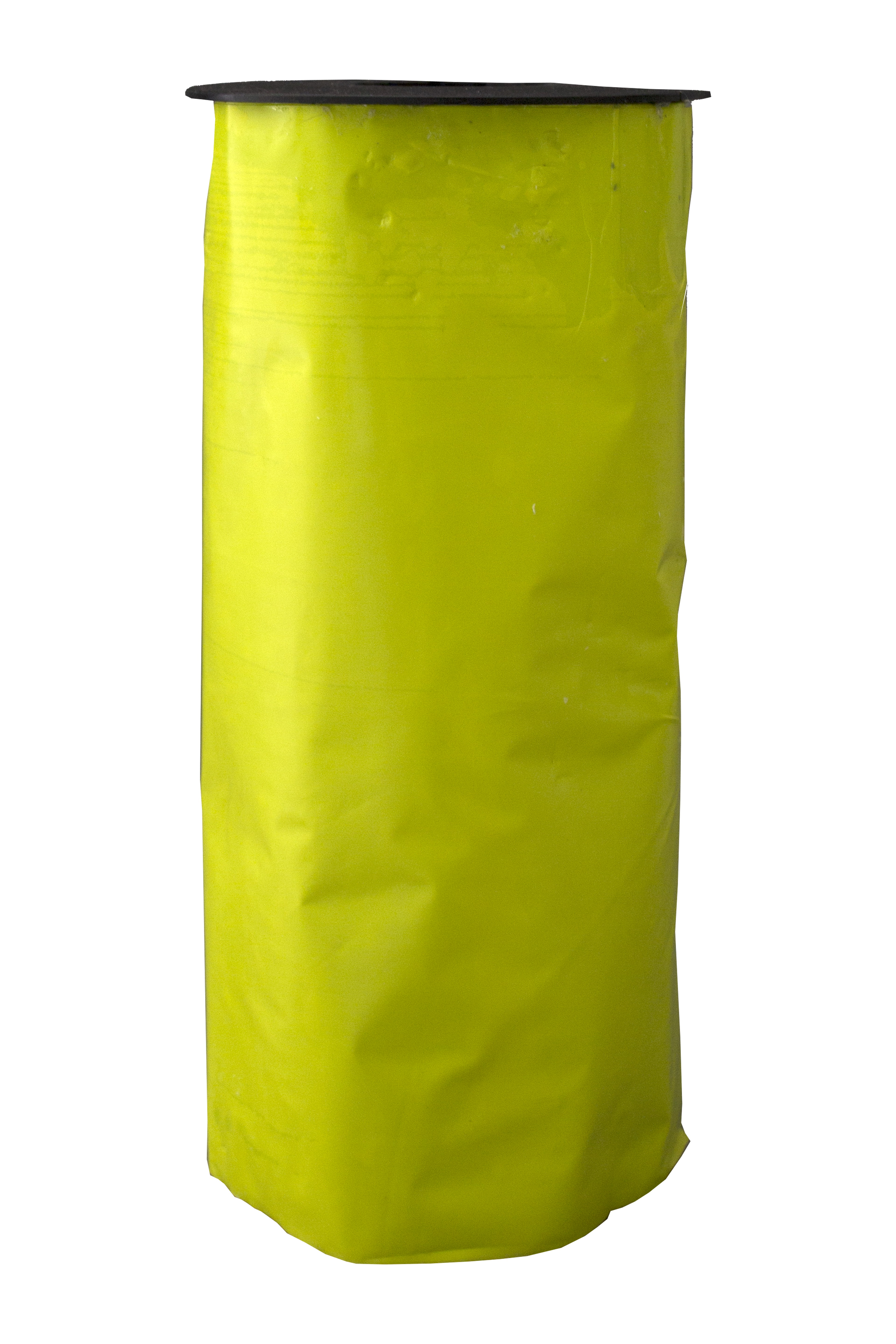
Sticky trap that attracts psyllids with its lime-green color

Recent efforts have focussed on understanding the various sensory cues that the psyllid uses to locate its host plant. Insight into the insect's behavior may lead to better methods for its control. One study demonstrated that perception of reflected ultraviolet wavelengths enhanced attraction to a yellow trap. Attempts to demonstrate attraction of the psyllid to volatile (air-borne) odors have failed to produce an effective attractant. It appears that this tiny insect is attracted by color (yellow and UV wavelengths) and decides to stay and feed on a particular plant only after alighting on a leaf and tasting it by probing with its mouthparts (stylets). Small molecules such as formic acid and acetic acid stimulate probing activity. These may be used in new, innovative traps or other devices.

Recent effort has illustrated that the spatial distribution of eggs and nymphs is a result of the movement patterns of gravid females in response to the oviposition sites. The dispersion indices were used to confirm the aggregated or contagious distribution pattern of D. citri population on the flushes within the tree and could be expressed by the negative binomial distribution. Measurable tests showed that distributions of eggs and nymphs in naturally occurring psyllid populations were highly aggregated, following initially aggregated migrations of adults and a contagious dispersion of adults on the flushes within trees as population densities increased. Increased population density in the field resulted in greater dispersion of population was the consequence of females' dispersal and their selection of oviposition sites. Because the exponential increase in dispersion can be predicted by means of the population density of immature stages, a sampling plan was developed from the relationship between the dispersion behaviour and population density rather than the relationship between economic damage and population density.
