= Citrus greening disease =

Bacterial disease of citrus, bug-borne

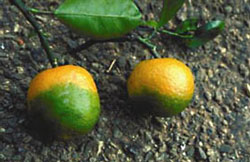
- Citrus greening disease on mandarin oranges
- Common names: HLB, citrus vein phloem degeneration (CVPD), citrus greening disease, yellow shoot disease, yellow dragon disease, leaf mottle yellows in the Philippines, citrus dieback in India
- Causal agents: Liberibacter spp. (L. asiaticus, L. africanus, L. americanus)
- Hosts: citrus trees
- Vectors: Diaphorina citri, Trioza erytreae
- EPPO Code: 1LIBEG
- Distribution: Asia, Africa, United States

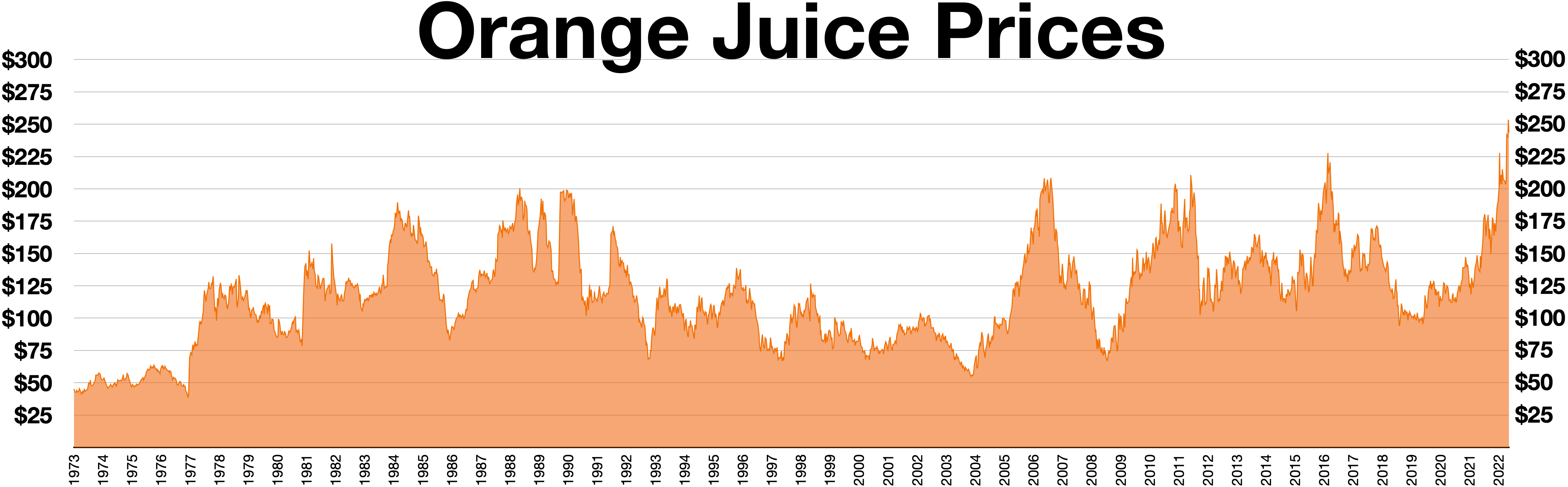
Orange juice prices 1973–2022. Citrus greening was first found in 2005 in the US and has cut the orange tree production in half.

Citrus greening disease (Chinese: 黃龍病; pinyin: huánglóngbìng abbr. HLB) is a disease of citrus trees caused by bacteria of the genus Liberibacter. These microbes are transmitted by two species of bug: the Asian citrus psyllid Diaphorina citri and the African citrus psyllid Trioza erytreae. It has no known cure. It is graft-transmissible.

There are three different types of the disease: a heat-tolerant Asian form, and the heat-sensitive African and American forms. It was first described and reported in southern China in 1919. The African variation was first reported in 1937 in South Africa, where it is still widespread. It reached Florida in 2005, and within three years had spread to the majority of citrus farms. The rapid increase in this disease has threatened the citrus industry in the entire US. As of 2009, 33 countries had reported the infection in their citrus crop.

== Symptoms ==
Citrus greening is distinguished by the common symptoms of yellowing of the veins and adjacent tissues (hence the "yellow dragon" name given by observing Chaozhou farmers as early as the 1870s); followed by splotchy mottling of the entire leaf, premature defoliation, dieback of twigs, decay of feeder rootlets and lateral roots, and decline in vigor, ultimately followed by the death of the entire plant. Affected trees have stunted growth, bear multiple off-season flowers (most of which fall off), and produce small, irregularly shaped fruit with a thick, pale peel that remains green at the bottom and tastes very bitter. Common symptoms can be mistaken for nutrient deficiencies; the distinguishing factor is the pattern of symmetry. Nutrient deficiencies tend to be symmetrical along the leaf vein margin, while HLB has an asymmetrical yellowing around the vein. The most noticeable symptom of HLB is greening and stunting of the fruit, especially after ripening.

== Transmission ==
Citrus greening was originally thought to be a viral disease, but is caused by a bacterium, carried by insect vectors. Infection can arise in various climates and is often associated with different species of psyllid insects. For example, citrus crops in Africa become infected under cool conditions as the bacteria are transmitted by the African citrus psyllid Trioza erytreae, an insect that favors cool and moist conditions for optimal activity. Citrus crops in Asia, however, are often infected under warm conditions as the bacteria are transmitted by the Asian citrus psyllid Diaphorina citri.

The young larval stage is the most suitable for acquisition of ca. L. asiaticus by the Asian citrus psyllid Diaphorina citri, and some cultivars show greater efficiency in transmitting the disease to the vector than others. Temperature also shows a great influence in the parasite-host relationship between the bacteria and the insect vector, affecting how it is acquired and transmitted by the insects.

The causative agents are fastidious phloem-restricted, Gram-negative bacteria in the gracilicutes clade. The Asian form, ca. L. asiaticus is heat tolerant. This means the greening symptoms can develop at temperatures up to 35 °C (95 °F). The African form, ca. L. africanus, and American form, ca. L. americanus, are heat sensitive, thus symptoms only develop when the temperature is in the range 20–25 °C (68–77 °F). Although T. erytreae is the natural vector of African citrus greening and D. citri is the natural vector of American and Asian citrus greening, either psyllid can in fact transmit either of the greening agents under experimental conditions.

== Distribution ==
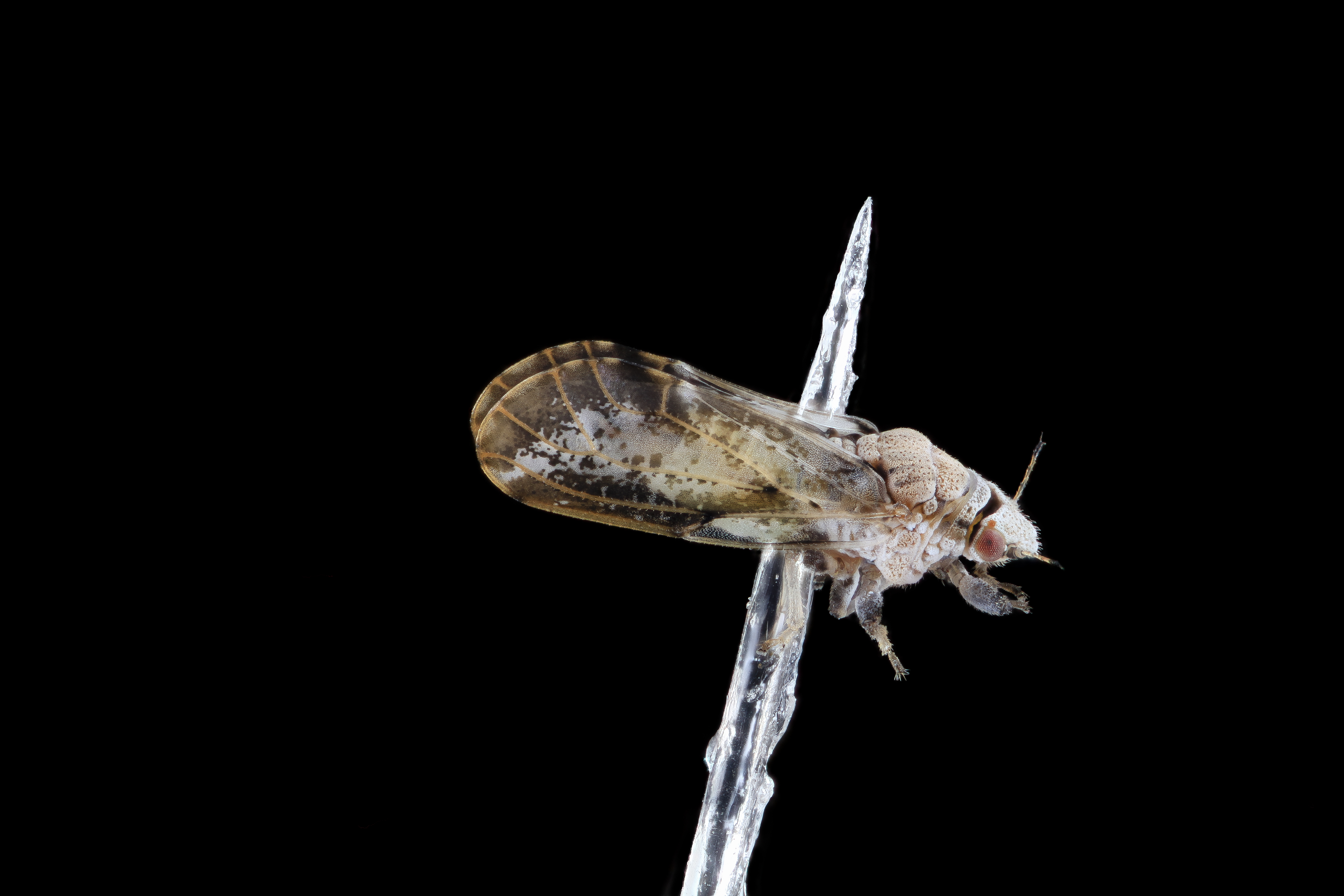
Diaphorina citri

Distribution of the Asian citrus psyllid is primarily in tropical and subtropical Asia. It has been reported in all citrus-growing regions in Asia except mainland Japan. The disease has affected crops in China, India, Sri Lanka, Malaysia, Indonesia, Myanmar, the Philippines, Pakistan, Thailand, the Ryukyu Islands, Nepal, Saudi Arabia, and Afghanistan. Areas outside Asia have also reported the disease: Réunion, Mauritius, Brazil, Paraguay, Florida since 2005, and in several municipalities in Mexico since 2009. On 30 March 2012, citrus greening disease was confirmed in a single citrus tree in California. The first report of HLB in Texas occurred on 13 January 2012, from a Valencia sweet orange tree in a commercial orchard in Texas. Prospects are bleak for the ubiquitous backyard citrus orchards of California as residential growers are unlikely to consistently use the pesticides which provide effective control in commercial orchards.

The distribution of the African citrus psyllid includes Africa, Madeira, Saudi Arabia, Portugal, and Yemen. This species is sensitive to high temperatures and will not develop at temperatures greater than 25 °C (77 °F). It is a vector of the African strain of huanglongbing (Candidatus Liberibacter africanus), which is sensitive to heat. This strain is reported to occur in Africa, (Burundi, Cameroon, Central African Republic, Comoros, Ethiopia, Kenya, Madagascar, Malawi, Mauritius, Reunion, Rwanda, South Africa, St. Helena [unconfirmed], Swaziland, Tanzania, Zimbabwe), Saudi Arabia, and Yemen. The disease was not reported in the EU as of 2004.

== Control ==
Some cultural practices are effective in managing this disease. Cultural methods include antibacterial management, sanitation, removal of infected plants, frequent scouting, and most importantly, crisis declaration. Tracking the disease can help prevent further infection in other affected areas and help mitigate more local infections, if detected early enough. The Asian citrus psyllid has alternative hosts that may attract psyllids to citrus plants in the vicinity such as Murraya paniculata, Severinia buxifolia, and other plants in the family Rutaceae.

No cure for citrus greening disease is known, and efforts to control it have been slow because infected citrus plants are difficult to maintain, regenerate, and study. Ongoing challenges associated with mitigating disease at the field-scale include seasonality of the phytopathogen (Liberibacter spp.) and associated disease symptoms, limitations for therapeutics to contact the phytopathogen in planta, adverse impacts of broad-spectrum treatments on plant-beneficial microbiota, and potential implications on public and ecosystem health. The effort to culture Candidatus Liberibacter asiaticus (CLas) has been a significant challenge in plant pathology. Progress has included culturing a different species of Liberibacter.

No naturally immune citrus cultivars have been identified. Creating genetically modified citrus may be a possible solution, but questions of its acceptability to consumers exist. A researcher at Texas AgriLife Research reported in 2012 that incorporating two genes from spinach into citrus trees improved resistance to citrus greening disease in greenhouse trials. Field tests by Southern Gardens Citrus of oranges with the spinach genes in Florida are ongoing.

A resistant variety of mandarin orange called 'Bingo' has been bred at the University of Florida. Some other varieties have a partial tolerance to the disease.

=== Antibiotics ===
Researchers at the Agricultural Research Service of the United States Department of Agriculture have used lemon trees infected with citrus greening disease to infect periwinkle plants to study the disease. Periwinkle plants are easily infected and respond well when experimentally treated with antibiotics. Researchers are testing the effect of penicillin G sodium and biocide 2,2-dibromo-3-nitrilopropionamide as potential treatments for infected citrus plants based on the positive results that were observed when applied to infected periwinkle. In June 2014, the USDA allocated an additional US$31.5 million to expand research combating the disease.

Certain antibiotics, specifically streptomycin and oxytetracycline, may be effective and have been used in the United States, but are banned in Brazil and the European Union. In 2016, the EPA allowed use of streptomycin and oxytetracycline on orchards with citrus fruits like grapefruits, oranges and tangerines in Florida on an emergency basis, this approval was expanded and broadened to other states for oxytetracycline in December 2018. Further expansion of medically important antibiotics is proposed by the EPA but opposed by the FDA and CDC, primarily as antibiotic resistance can be expected to develop and affect human health.

=== Possible future treatments ===
A peptide that prevents and treats citrus greening disease in greenhouse trials was being tested in field trials in 2021; an enhanced injectable version of the product was being developed in 2020.

Two types of antisense oligonucleotide (FANA and Morpholinos) can be delivered efficiently into citrus trees, suppressing their RNA targets. FANA can suppress 'Candidatus Liberibacter asiaticus' in citrus trees.

Morpholinos can suppress CLas in infected citrus trees and the psyllid vectors. Furthermore, the PPMOs designed to endosymbiotic bacteria of the psyllid vectors, can reduce psyllid populations by targeting and suppressing the insects endosymbionts, the bacteria which are essential for psyllid survival. Morpholinos must be covalently linked with a charged molecule or peptide, to enter bacteria. The target RNA is made susceptible to cleavage by ribonuclease P (RNase-P).

Researchers at the Chinese Academy of Sciences found that the E3 ubiquitin ligase PUB21 acts as an essential susceptibility gene, marking the MYC2 transcription factor for degradation. Introduction of a dominant negative variant of PUB21 was successful in conferring resistance to HLB by stabilizing MYC2 levels.

=== Cover crops ===
Some success has been reported using a cover crop strategy. The citrus trees were not free of the disease bacteria, yet a healthy soil environment allowed them to produce fruit and remain profitable.

== See also ==
- Citrus black spot
- Olive quick decline syndrome
- Plant pathology
