= List of Laboulbeniaceae genera =

The Laboulbeniaceae are a large family of fungi in the Laboulbeniales order in the Ascomycota. This is a widely distributed family that are parasitic to various orders of insects. This is a list of the genera within the family, based on the 2007 Outline of Ascomycota.

- Acallomyces Thaxt.
- Acompsomyces Thaxt.
- Acrogynomyces Thaxt.
- Amorphomyces Thaxt.
- Amphimyces Thaxt.
- Apatelomyces Thaxt.
- Apatomyces Thaxt.
- Aphanandromyces W.Rossi
- Aporomyces Thaxt.
- Arthrorhynchus Kolen.
- Asaphomyces Thaxt.
- Autophagomyces Thaxt.
- Balazusia R.K. Benj.
- Benjaminiomyces I.I.Tav.
- Blasticomyces I.I.Tav.
- Botryandromyces I.I.Tav. & T. Majewski
- Camptomyces Thaxt.
- Cantharomyces Thaxt.
- Capillistichus Santam.
- Carpophoromyces Thaxt.
- Chaetarthriomyces Thaxt.
- Chaetomyces Thaxt.
- Chitonomyces Peyronel
- Clematomyces Thaxt.
- Clonophoromyces Thaxt.
- Columnomyces R.K.Benj.
- Compsomyces Thaxt.
- Coreomyces Thaxt.
- Corethromyces Thaxt.
- Corylophomyces R.K.Benj.
- Cryptandromyces Thaxt.
- Cucujomyces Speg.
- Cupulomyces R.K.Benj.
- Dermapteromyces Thaxt.
- Diandromyces Thaxt.
- Diaphoromyces Thaxt.
- Diclonomyces Thaxt.
- Dimeromyces Thaxt.
- Dimorphomyces Thaxt.
- Dioicomyces Thaxt.
- Diphymyces I.I.Tav.
- Diplomyces Thaxt. (position uncertain)
- Diplopodomyces W.Rossi & Balazuc
- Dipodomyces Thaxt.
- Distolomyces Thaxt.
- Dixomyces I.I.Tav.
- Ecteinomyces Thaxt.
- Enarthromyces Thaxt.
- Eucantharomyces Thaxt.
- Euhaplomyces Thaxt.
- Eumisgomyces Speg.
- Eumonoicomyces Thaxt.
- Euphoriomyces Thaxt.
- Fanniomyces Maj.
- Filariomyces Shanor
- Gloeandromyces Thaxt.
- Haplomyces Thaxt.
- Hesperomyces Thaxt.
- Histeridomyces Thaxt.
- Homaromyces R.K.Benj.
- Hydraeomyces Thaxt.
- Hydrophilomyces Thaxt.
- Idiomyces Thaxt.
- Ilyomyces F.Picard
- Ilytheomyces Thaxt.
- Kainomyces Thaxt.
- Kleidiomyces Thaxt.
- Kruphaiomyces Thaxt.
- Kyphomyces I.I.Tav.
- Laboulbenia Mont. & C.P.Robin
- Limnaiomyces Thaxt.
- Majewskia Y.-B.Lee & Sugiyama
- Meionomyces Thaxt.
- Microsomyces Thaxt.
- Mimeomyces Thaxt.
- Misgomyces Thaxt.
- Monandromyces R.K.Benj.
- Monoicomyces Thaxt.
- Nanomyces Thaxt.
- Neohaplomyces R.K.Benj.
- Nycteromyces Thaxt.
- Ormomyces I.I.Tav.
- Osoriomyces Terada
- Parvomyces Santam.
- Peyerimhoffiella Maire
- Peyritschiella Thaxt.
- Phalacrichomyces R.K.Benjamin
- Phaulomyces Thaxt.
- Picardella I.I.Tav.
- Polyandromyces Thaxt.
- Polyascomyces Thaxt.
- Porophoromyces Thaxt.
- Prolixandromyces R.K.Benj.
- Pselaphidomyces Speg.
- Rhachomyces Thaxt.
- Rhipidiomyces Thaxt.
- Rhizomyces Thaxt.
- Rhizopodomyces Thaxt.
- Rickia Cavara
- Rossiomyces R.K.Benj.
- Sandersoniomyces R.K.Benj.
- Scalenomyces I.I.Tav.
- Scaphidiomyces Thaxt.
- Scelophoromyces Thaxt.
- Scepastocarpus Santam.
- Siemaszkoa I.I.Tav. & Maj.
- Smeringomyces Thaxt.
- Sphaleromyces Thaxt.
- Stemmatomyces Thaxt.
- Stichomyces Thaxt.
- Stigmatomyces H.Karst.
- Sugiyamaemyces I.Tavares & Balazuc
- Symplectromyces Thaxt.
- Sympodomyces R.K.Benj.
- Synandromyces Thaxt.
- Tavaresiella T.Majewski
- Teratomyces Thaxt.
- Tetrandromyces Thaxt.
- Trenomyces Chatton & F.Picard
- Triainomyces W. Rossi & A.Weir
- Triceromyces T.Majewski
- Trochoideomyces Thaxt.
- Troglomyces S.Colla
- Zeugandromyces Thaxt.
- Zodiomyces Thaxt.
