= Acallomyces =

Scientific classification
- Domain: Eukaryota
- Kingdom: Fungi
- Division: Ascomycota
- Class: Laboulbeniomycetes
- Order: Laboulbeniales
- Family: Laboulbeniaceae
- Genus: Acallomyces; Thaxt. (1903)

Type species
- Acallomyces homalotae Thaxt. (1903)

Species
- A. gyrophaenae A. homalotae A. platyolae

Genus of fungi

Acallomyces is a genus of fungi in the family Laboulbeniaceae. The genus contain three species.

== See also ==
- List of Laboulbeniaceae genera
