= Apatomyces =

Scientific classification
- Kingdom: Fungi
- Division: Ascomycota
- Class: Laboulbeniomycetes
- Order: Laboulbeniales
- Family: Laboulbeniaceae
- Genus: Apatomyces; Thaxt. (1931)

Type species
- Apatomyces laboulbenioides Thaxt. (1931)

Genus of fungi

Apatomyces is a fungal genus in the family Laboulbeniaceae. A monotypic genus, Apatomyces contains the single species Apatomyces laboulbenioides.

== See also ==
- List of Laboulbeniaceae genera
