= Laboulbenia slackensis =

Scientific classification
- Domain: Eukaryota
- Kingdom: Fungi
- Division: Ascomycota
- Class: Laboulbeniomycetes
- Order: Laboulbeniales
- Family: Laboulbeniaceae
- Genus: Laboulbenia
- Species: L. slackensis

Binomial name
- Laboulbenia slackensis Cépède & F. Picard

Species of fungus

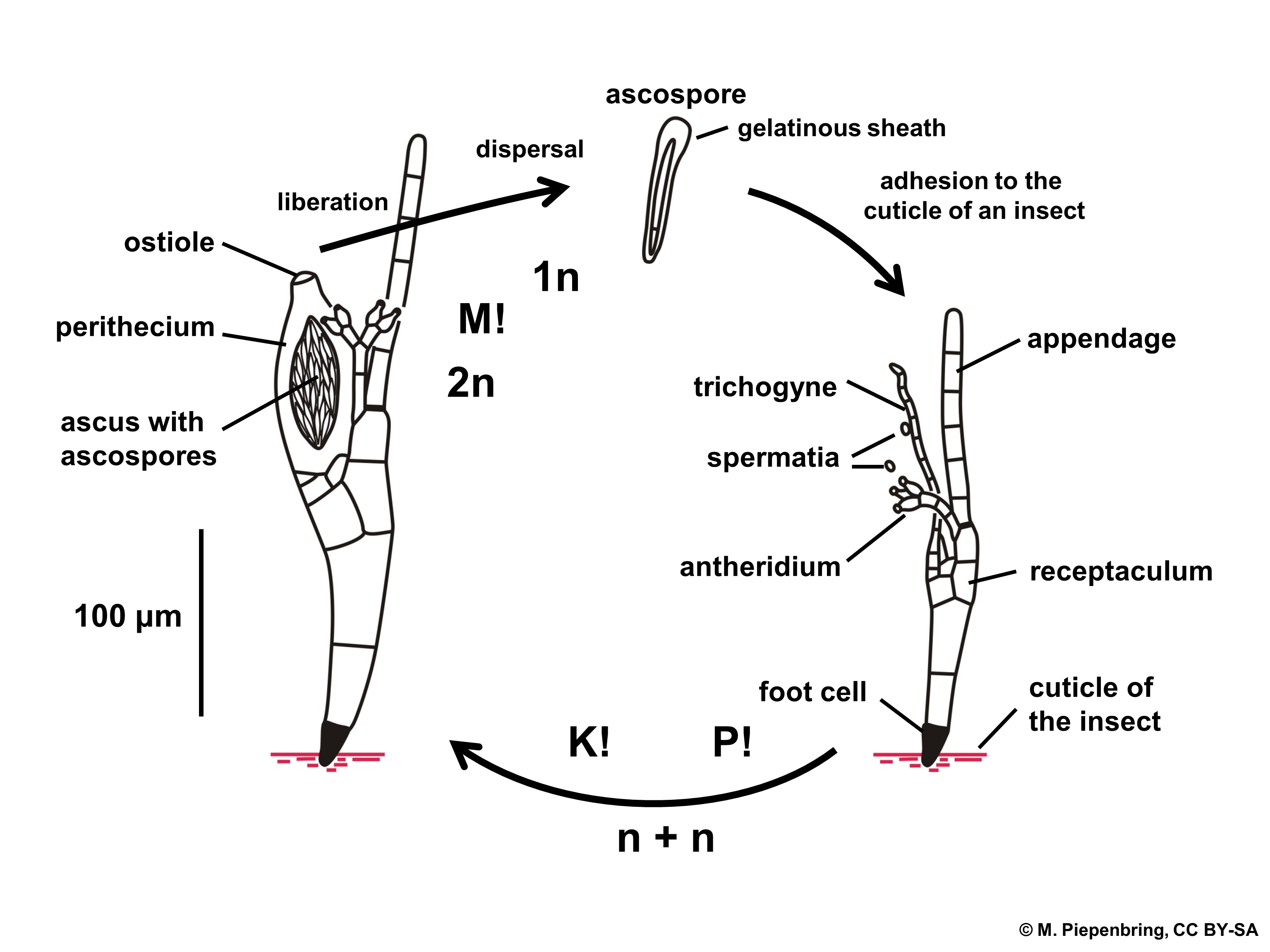
Generalized life cycle of a Laboulbenia fungus. L. slackensis follows the stages of this life cycle, including the development of a sticky ascospore and a foot cell to anchor itself to the host.

Laboulbenia slackensis is a microscopic fungus found on Carabidae arthropods. Like all fungi found in the Laboulbeniomycetes class, L. slackensis is an obligate ectoparasite and lives its entire life cycle on one host. It is differentiated from other related species based on host preference, and is studied as an example of speciation due to ecological niche preference.

== Habitat and distribution ==
L. slackensis spends its entire life cycle confined to one host. Its preferred host species is the beetle Pogonus chalceus. The optimal habitat of the beetle is salt marshes, although they have been found in a variety of habitats. High levels of humidity are associated with larger populations of the fungus. Specimens have been collected from all over the world, including Japan, the Netherlands, Finland, and Belgium.

== Morphology ==
The fungus forms microscopic thalli around 1mm in length. It is a perithecial ascomycete, with one perithecium on each thallus. Ascus development and ascospore formation within the perithecium have never been observed. Mature ascospores are two-celled and are tapered on both ends. The coating of the ascospore is sticky to ensure attachment to a new host. The fungus attaches itself to the host integument via the foot cell. Each thallus also includes several appendages, which develop into reproductive structures such as a trichogyne and an antheridium. Thalli do not appear to cause damage to the host, although large numbers of thalli can reduce host fitness and cause death. It is morphologically similar to many Laboulbeniomycetes and is often differentiated solely based on host preference.

== Transmission ==
Thalli typically develop over the course of three weeks, although a maximum life cycle of 10 weeks has been observed. Only a sexual reproductive cycle has been observed. Transmission largely occurs through direct transmission when an infected host comes into contact with another suitable host. The ascospores form thread-like structures which aid in adherence to a new host. Within beetle populations, similar infection sizes are reached on each host. This is thought to occur due to unidirectional spore transmission balancing out infection sizes between hosts. Auto-infection of the same host is negligible unless large populations of the fungus are present on the infected beetle. Populations of the fungus are linked to host populations, with solitary beetles supporting smaller numbers of thalli.

Although the fungus is univorous in nature, laboratory conditions can cause successful artificial transmissions to 19 other carabid species. Ecological conditions, such as soil composition and humidity, must be kept as close to natural conditions as possible to support infection on hosts other than P. chalceus.

== Nutrition ==
It is unclear how the fungus feeds from the host. Possible mechanisms for feeding include water and nutrient absorption through the thalli or uptake of waxy lipids produced by the host.

== Speciation ==
Sister species, such as Laboulbenia littoralis, are often found on other host species in the same habitat. Speciation was caused due to ecological separation due to host preference and environmental conditions.

The close relationship between the fungi and its host may have led to co-evolution and an evolutionary arms race between the two species. One example of this may be the lack of haustoria in L. slackensis. The lack of haustoria allows for the fungus to go unrecognized by the host until the thalli mature.

Morphological constructs have been proved to be an unreliable way to determine species. Genetic sequencing studies have begun on related species in this genus, although the practicality remains limited due to the difficulties of collecting enough molecular samples.

== See also ==
Laboulbenia quarantenae
