= Aporomyces =

Scientific classification
- Kingdom: Fungi
- Division: Ascomycota
- Class: Laboulbeniomycetes
- Order: Laboulbeniales
- Family: Laboulbeniaceae
- Genus: Aporomyces; Thaxt. (1931)

Type species
- Aporomyces uniflagellatus Thaxt. (1931)

Species
- A. byrrhini A. lutrochi A. perpusillus A. physemi A. subulatus A. szaboi A. trinitatis A. uniflagellatus

Genus of fungi

Aporomyces is a genus of fungi in the family Laboulbeniaceae. The genus contain 8 species.

== See also ==
- List of Laboulbeniaceae genera
