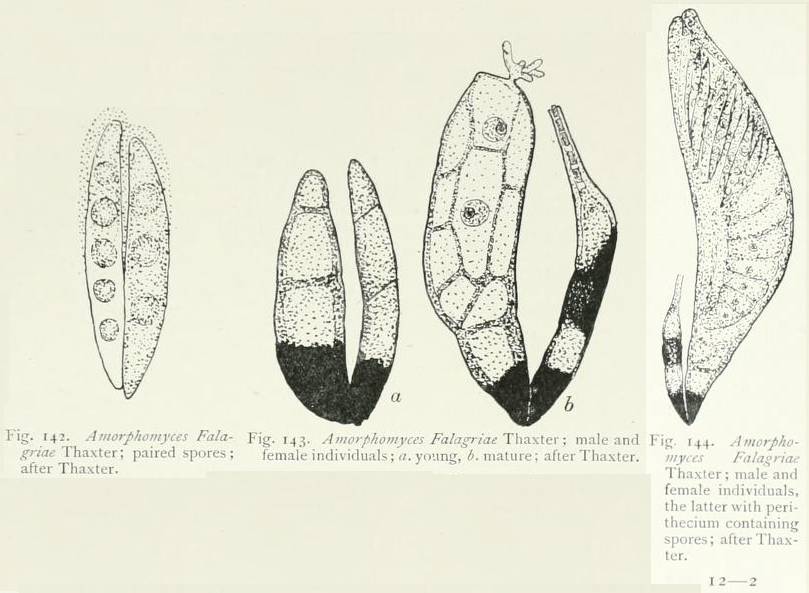
- Amorphomyces falagriae

Scientific classification
- Kingdom: Fungi
- Division: Ascomycota
- Class: Laboulbeniomycetes
- Order: Laboulbeniales
- Family: Laboulbeniaceae
- Genus: Amorphomyces; Thaxt. (1893)

Type species
- Amorphomyces falagriae Thaxt. (1893)

= Amorphomyces =

Genus of fungi

Amorphomyces is a genus of fungi in the family Laboulbeniaceae.

== Species ==
- Amorphomyces biformis
- Amorphomyces falagriae Thaxt. (1893)
- Amorphomyces floridanus
- Amorphomyces hernandoi
- Amorphomyces italicus
- Amorphomyces minisculus
- Amorphomyces minusculus
- Amorphomyces obliqueseptatus
- Amorphomyces ophioglossae
- Amorphomyces pronomaeae
- Amorphomyces rubescens
- Amorphomyces schistogeniae
- Amorphomyces stenusae
- Amorphomyces stipitatus
- Amorphomyces trogophloei

== See also ==
- List of Laboulbeniaceae genera
