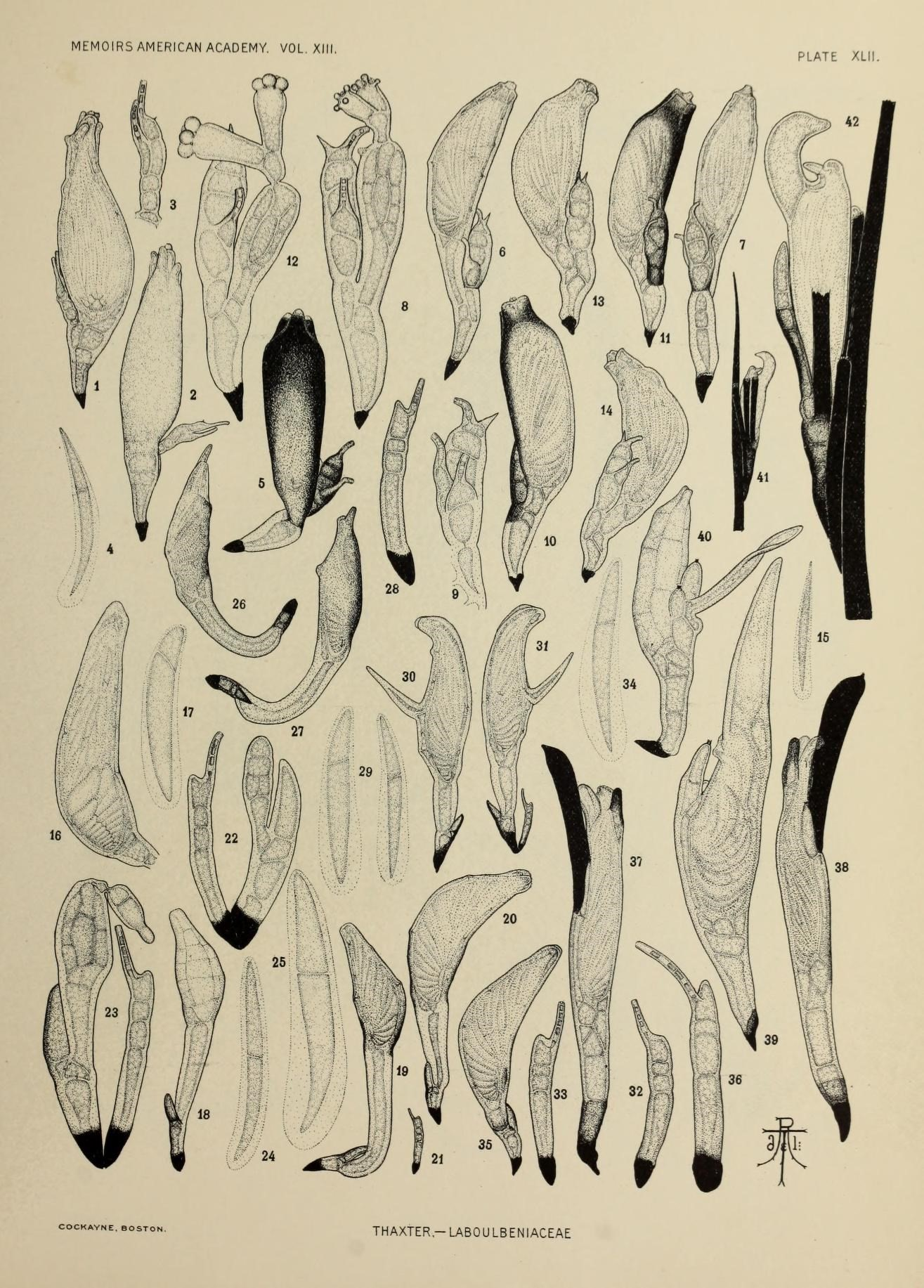
- 5 Acompsomyces corticariae, 6–9 Acompsomyces atomariae, 10–12 Acompsomyces brunneolus, 13–15 Acompsomyces pauperculus

Scientific classification
- Domain: Eukaryota
- Kingdom: Fungi
- Division: Ascomycota
- Class: Laboulbeniomycetes
- Order: Laboulbeniales
- Family: Laboulbeniaceae
- Genus: Acompsomyces; Thaxt. (1901)

Type species
- Acompsomyces corticariae Thaxt. (1901)

Species
- A. atomaria; A. brunneolus; A. corticariae; A. decarthricola; A. ootypi; A. parvus; A. pauperculus; A. stenichni

= Acompsomyces =

Genus of fungi

Acompsomyces is a genus of fungi in the family Laboulbeniaceae. A 2008 estimate placed seven species in the genus.

== See also ==
- List of Laboulbeniaceae genera
