= Amphimyces =

Scientific classification
- Kingdom: Fungi
- Division: Ascomycota
- Class: Laboulbeniomycetes
- Order: Laboulbeniales
- Family: Laboulbeniaceae
- Genus: Amphimyces; Thaxt. (1931)

Type species
- Amphimyces cerylonis Thaxt. (1931)

Genus of fungi

Amphimyces is a fungal genus in the family Laboulbeniaceae. This is a monotypic genus, containing the single species Amphimyces cerylonis.

== See also ==
- List of Laboulbeniaceae genera
