= Acrogynomyces =

Scientific classification
- Kingdom: Fungi
- Division: Ascomycota
- Class: Laboulbeniomycetes
- Order: Laboulbeniales
- Family: Laboulbeniaceae
- Genus: Acrogynomyces; Thaxt. (1931)

Type species
- Acrogynomyces eumicri Thaxt. (1931)

Species
- A. arietinus A. ellipsoideus A. eumicralis A. eumicri A. eumicricola A. hamatus

Genus of fungi

Acrogynomyces is a genus of fungi in the family Laboulbeniaceae. The genus contain six species.

== See also ==
- List of Laboulbeniaceae genera
