= Diplomyces =

Scientific classification
- Kingdom: Fungi
- Division: Ascomycota
- Class: Laboulbeniomycetes
- Order: Laboulbeniales
- Family: Laboulbeniaceae
- Genus: Diplomyces; Thaxt.

Type species
- Diplomyces actobianus Thaxt.

Genus of fungi

Diplomyces is a genus of fungi in the family Laboulbeniaceae. The genus contain 3 species.
