= Trochoideomyces =

Scientific classification
- Kingdom: Fungi
- Division: Ascomycota
- Class: Laboulbeniomycetes
- Order: Laboulbeniales
- Family: Laboulbeniaceae
- Genus: Trochoideomyces; Thaxt.

Type species
- Trochoideomyces gracilicaulis Thaxt.

Genus of fungi

Trochoideomyces is a genus of fungi in the family Laboulbeniaceae. A monotypic genus, it contains the single species Trochoideomyces gracilicaulis.
