= Scelophoromyces =

Scientific classification
- Kingdom: Fungi
- Division: Ascomycota
- Class: Laboulbeniomycetes
- Order: Laboulbeniales
- Family: Laboulbeniaceae
- Genus: Scelophoromyces; Thaxt.

Type species
- Scelophoromyces osorianus Thaxt.

Genus of fungi

Scelophoromyces is a genus of fungi in the family Laboulbeniaceae. A monotypic genus, it contains the single species Scelophoromyces osorianus.
