= Nycteromyces =

Scientific classification
- Kingdom: Fungi
- Division: Ascomycota
- Class: Laboulbeniomycetes
- Order: Laboulbeniales
- Family: Laboulbeniaceae
- Genus: Nycteromyces; Thaxt.

Type species
- Nycteromyces streblidinus Thaxt.

Genus of fungi

Nycteromyces is a genus of fungi in the family Laboulbeniaceae. This is a monotypic genus, containing the single species Nycteromyces streblidinus.
