= Chaetomyces =

Scientific classification
- Kingdom: Fungi
- Division: Ascomycota
- Class: Laboulbeniomycetes
- Order: Laboulbeniales
- Family: Laboulbeniaceae
- Genus: Chaetomyces; Thaxt.

Type species
- Chaetomyces pinophili Thaxt.

Species
- C. pinophili C. pterogenii

Genus of fungi

Chaetomyces is a genus of fungi in the family Laboulbeniaceae.
