= Eumonoicomyces =

Scientific classification
- Kingdom: Fungi
- Division: Ascomycota
- Class: Laboulbeniomycetes
- Order: Laboulbeniales
- Family: Laboulbeniaceae
- Genus: Eumonoicomyces; Thaxt.

Type species
- Eumonoicomyces californicus Thaxt.

Genus of fungi

Eumonoicomyces is a genus of fungi in the family Laboulbeniaceae. The genus contain 2 or 3 species.
