= Compsomyces =

Scientific classification
- Kingdom: Fungi
- Division: Ascomycota
- Class: Laboulbeniomycetes
- Order: Laboulbeniales
- Family: Laboulbeniaceae
- Genus: Compsomyces; Thaxt.

Type species
- Compsomyces verticillatus (Thaxt.) Thaxt.

Genus of fungi

Compsomyces is a genus of fungi in the family Laboulbeniaceae. The genus contain 7 species.
