= Aphanandromyces =

Scientific classification
- Kingdom: Fungi
- Division: Ascomycota
- Class: Laboulbeniomycetes
- Order: Laboulbeniales
- Family: Laboulbeniaceae
- Genus: Aphanandromyces; W.Rossi (1982)

Type species
- Aphanandromyces audisioi W.Rossi (1982)

Genus of fungi

Aphanandromyces is a fungal genus in the family Laboulbeniaceae. This is a monotypic genus, containing the single species Aphanandromyces audisioi.

== See also ==
- List of Laboulbeniaceae genera
