= Rhachomyces =

Scientific classification
- Kingdom: Fungi
- Division: Ascomycota
- Class: Laboulbeniomycetes
- Order: Laboulbeniales
- Family: Laboulbeniaceae
- Genus: Rhachomyces; Thaxt.

Type species
- Rhachomyces lasiophorus (Thaxt.) Thaxt.

Genus of fungi

Rhachomyces is a genus of fungi in the family Laboulbeniaceae. The genus contains 71 species.
