= Kruphaiomyces =

Scientific classification
- Kingdom: Fungi
- Division: Ascomycota
- Class: Laboulbeniomycetes
- Order: Laboulbeniales
- Family: Laboulbeniaceae
- Genus: Kruphaiomyces; Thaxt.

Type species
- Kruphaiomyces trochoidei Thaxt.

Genus of fungi

Kruphaiomyces is a genus of fungi in the family Laboulbeniaceae. A monotypic genus, it contains the single species Kruphaiomyces trochoidei.
