= Misgomyces =

Scientific classification
- Kingdom: Fungi
- Division: Ascomycota
- Class: Laboulbeniomycetes
- Order: Laboulbeniales
- Family: Laboulbeniaceae
- Genus: Misgomyces; Thaxt.

Type species
- Misgomyces dyschirii Thaxt.

Genus of fungi

Misgomyces is a genus of fungi in the family Laboulbeniaceae. The genus contain 4 species.

== Species ==
- Misgomyces annae T. Majewski 1973
- Misgomyces dyschirii Thaxt. 1900
- Misgomyces flexus T. Majewski 1973
- Misgomyces heteroceri Maire 1920
- Misgomyces ptenidii Scheloske 1969 (also as Siemaszkoa ptenidii)
- Misgomyces trichopterophilus (Thaxt.) Thaxt. 1931
