= Euphoriomyces =

Scientific classification
- Kingdom: Fungi
- Division: Ascomycota
- Class: Laboulbeniomycetes
- Order: Laboulbeniales
- Family: Laboulbeniaceae
- Genus: Euphoriomyces; Thaxt.

Type species
- Euphoriomyces bilateralis Thaxt.

Genus of fungi

Euphoriomyces is a genus of fungi in the family Laboulbeniaceae. The genus contain 13 species.
