= Mimeomyces =

Scientific classification
- Kingdom: Fungi
- Division: Ascomycota
- Class: Laboulbeniomycetes
- Order: Laboulbeniales
- Family: Laboulbeniaceae
- Genus: Mimeomyces; Thaxt.

Type species
- Mimeomyces decipiens Thaxt.

Genus of fungi

Mimeomyces is a genus of fungi in the family Laboulbeniaceae. The genus contain 16 species.
