= Cantharomyces =

Scientific classification
- Kingdom: Fungi
- Division: Ascomycota
- Class: Laboulbeniomycetes
- Order: Laboulbeniales
- Family: Laboulbeniaceae
- Genus: Cantharomyces; Thaxt. (1890)

Type species
- Cantharomyces bledii Thaxt. (1890)

Genus of fungi

Cantharomyces is a genus of about 30 species of fungi in the family Laboulbeniaceae.

== Species ==
- C. abbrevia
- C. ancyrophori
- C. andinus
- C. aploderi
- C. aquaticus
- C. bledii
- C. bordei
- C. bruchii
- C. chilensis
- C. denigratus
- C. elongatus
- C. exiguus
- C. flagellatus
- C. haytiensis
- C. italicus
- C. japonicus
- C. magellanicus
- C. numidicus
- C. occidentalis
- C. orientalis
- C. pacei
- C. permasculus
- C. platensis
- C. platystethi
- C. pusillus
- C. robustus
- C. thaxteri
- C. trogophloei
- C. valdivianus
- C. vene
