= Clonophoromyces =

Scientific classification
- Kingdom: Fungi
- Division: Ascomycota
- Class: Laboulbeniomycetes
- Order: Laboulbeniales
- Family: Laboulbeniaceae
- Genus: Clonophoromyces; Thaxt.

Type species
- Clonophoromyces grenadinus Thaxt.

Species
- C. grenadinus C. nipponicus

Genus of fungi

Clonophoromyces is a genus of fungi in the family Laboulbeniaceae.
