= Dimorphomyces =

Scientific classification
- Kingdom: Fungi
- Division: Ascomycota
- Class: Laboulbeniomycetes
- Order: Laboulbeniales
- Family: Laboulbeniaceae
- Genus: Dimorphomyces; Thaxt.

Type species
- Dimorphomyces denticulatus Thaxt.

Genus of fungi

Dimorphomyces is a genus of fungi in the family Laboulbeniaceae. The genus contain 27 species.
