= Diandromyces =

Scientific classification
- Kingdom: Fungi
- Division: Ascomycota
- Class: Laboulbeniomycetes
- Order: Laboulbeniales
- Family: Laboulbeniaceae
- Genus: Diandromyces; Thaxt.

Type species
- Diandromyces chilenus Thaxt.

Genus of fungi

Diandromyces is a genus of fungi in the family Laboulbeniaceae. A monotypic genus, Diandromyces contains the single species Diandromyces chilenus.
