= Hydraeomyces =

Scientific classification
- Kingdom: Fungi
- Division: Ascomycota
- Class: Laboulbeniomycetes
- Order: Laboulbeniales
- Family: Laboulbeniaceae
- Genus: Hydraeomyces; Thaxt.

Type species
- Hydraeomyces halipli (Thaxt.) Thaxt.

Species
- H. halipli H. venetus

Genus of fungi

Hydraeomyces is a genus of fungi in the family Laboulbeniaceae. The genus contain xx species.
