= Dipodomyces =

Scientific classification
- Kingdom: Fungi
- Division: Ascomycota
- Class: Laboulbeniomycetes
- Order: Laboulbeniales
- Family: Laboulbeniaceae
- Genus: Dipodomyces; Thaxt.

Type species
- Dipodomyces monstruosus Thaxt.

Genus of fungi

Dipodomyces is a genus of fungi in the family Laboulbeniaceae. The genus contain 2 species.
