= Coreomyces =

Scientific classification
- Kingdom: Fungi
- Division: Ascomycota
- Class: Laboulbeniomycetes
- Order: Laboulbeniales
- Family: Laboulbeniaceae
- Genus: Coreomyces; Thaxt.

Type species
- Coreomyces corisae Thaxt.

Genus of fungi

Coreomyces is a genus of fungi in the family Laboulbeniaceae. The genus contain 20 species.
