= Teratomyces =

Scientific classification
- Kingdom: Fungi
- Division: Ascomycota
- Class: Laboulbeniomycetes
- Order: Laboulbeniales
- Family: Laboulbeniaceae
- Genus: Teratomyces; Thaxt.

Type species
- Teratomyces mirificus Thaxt.

Genus of fungi

Teratomyces is a genus of fungi in the family Laboulbeniaceae. The genus contains nine species.
