= Picardella =

Scientific classification
- Kingdom: Fungi
- Division: Ascomycota
- Class: Laboulbeniomycetes
- Order: Laboulbeniales
- Family: Laboulbeniaceae
- Genus: Picardella; I.I. Tav.

Type species
- Picardella endogaea (F.Picard) I.I. Tav.

Genus of fungi

Picardella is a genus of fungi in the family Laboulbeniaceae. The genus contain 2 species.
