= Euhaplomyces =

Scientific classification
- Kingdom: Fungi
- Division: Ascomycota
- Class: Laboulbeniomycetes
- Order: Laboulbeniales
- Family: Laboulbeniaceae
- Genus: Euhaplomyces; Thaxt.

Type species
- Euhaplomyces ancyrophori Thaxt.

Genus of fungi

Euhaplomyces is a genus of fungi in the family Laboulbeniaceae. A monotypic genus, Euhaplomyces contains the single species Euhaplomyces ancyrophori.
