= Ecteinomyces =

Scientific classification
- Kingdom: Fungi
- Division: Ascomycota
- Class: Laboulbeniomycetes
- Order: Laboulbeniales
- Family: Laboulbeniaceae
- Genus: Ecteinomyces; Thaxt.

Type species
- Ecteinomyces trichopterophilus Thaxt.

Genus of fungi

Ecteinomyces is a genus of fungi in the family Laboulbeniaceae.
