= Phaulomyces =

Scientific classification
- Kingdom: Fungi
- Division: Ascomycota
- Class: Laboulbeniomycetes
- Order: Laboulbeniales
- Family: Laboulbeniaceae
- Genus: Phaulomyces; Thaxt.

Type species
- Phaulomyces corylophodis Thaxt.

Genus of fungi

Phaulomyces is a genus of fungi in the family Laboulbeniaceae. The genus contain 14 species.
