= Synandromyces =

Scientific classification
- Kingdom: Fungi
- Division: Ascomycota
- Class: Laboulbeniomycetes
- Order: Laboulbeniales
- Family: Laboulbeniaceae
- Genus: Synandromyces; Thaxt.

Type species
- Synandromyces telephani Thaxt.

Genus of fungi

Synandromyces is a genus of fungi in the family Laboulbeniaceae. The genus contain 10 species.
