= Zeugandromyces =

Scientific classification
- Kingdom: Fungi
- Division: Ascomycota
- Class: Laboulbeniomycetes
- Order: Laboulbeniales
- Family: Laboulbeniaceae
- Genus: Zeugandromyces; Thaxt.

Type species
- Zeugandromyces australis Thaxt.

Species
- Zeugandromyces australis; Zeugandromyces orientalis; Zeugandromyces stilici

Genus of fungi

Zeugandromyces is a genus of fungi in the family Laboulbeniaceae. The genus contain 3 species.
