= Rhipidiomyces =

Scientific classification
- Kingdom: Fungi
- Division: Ascomycota
- Class: Laboulbeniomycetes
- Order: Laboulbeniales
- Family: Laboulbeniaceae
- Genus: Rhipidiomyces; Thaxt.

Type species
- Rhipidiomyces acriti Thaxt.

Genus of fungi

Rhipidiomyces is a genus of fungi in the family Laboulbeniaceae. This is a monotypic genus, containing the single species Rhipidiomyces acriti.
