= Ormomyces =

Scientific classification
- Kingdom: Fungi
- Division: Ascomycota
- Class: Laboulbeniomycetes
- Order: Laboulbeniales
- Family: Laboulbeniaceae
- Genus: Ormomyces; I.I. Tav.

Type species
- Ormomyces clivinae (Thaxt.) I.I. Tav.

Genus of fungi

Ormomyces is a genus of fungi in the family Laboulbeniaceae. This is a monotypic genus, containing the single species Ormomyces clivinae.
