= Scalenomyces =

Scientific classification
- Kingdom: Fungi
- Division: Ascomycota
- Class: Laboulbeniomycetes
- Order: Laboulbeniales
- Family: Laboulbeniaceae
- Genus: Scalenomyces; I.I. Tav.

Type species
- Scalenomyces endogaeus (F.Picard) I.I. Tav.

Genus of fungi

Scalenomyces is a genus of fungi in the family Laboulbeniaceae. A monotypic genus, it contains the single species Scalenomyces endogaeus.
