= Dermapteromyces =

Scientific classification
- Kingdom: Fungi
- Division: Ascomycota
- Class: Laboulbeniomycetes
- Order: Laboulbeniales
- Family: Laboulbeniaceae
- Genus: Dermapteromyces; Thaxt.

Type species
- Dermapteromyces ctenophorus Thaxt.

Genus of fungi

Dermapteromyces is a genus of fungi in the family Laboulbeniaceae. The genus contain three species.
