= Microsomyces =

Scientific classification
- Kingdom: Fungi
- Division: Ascomycota
- Class: Laboulbeniomycetes
- Order: Laboulbeniales
- Family: Laboulbeniaceae
- Genus: Microsomyces; Thaxt.

Type species
- Microsomyces psammoechi Thaxt.

Genus of fungi

Microsomyces is a genus of fungi in the family Laboulbeniaceae. The genus contain 2 species.
