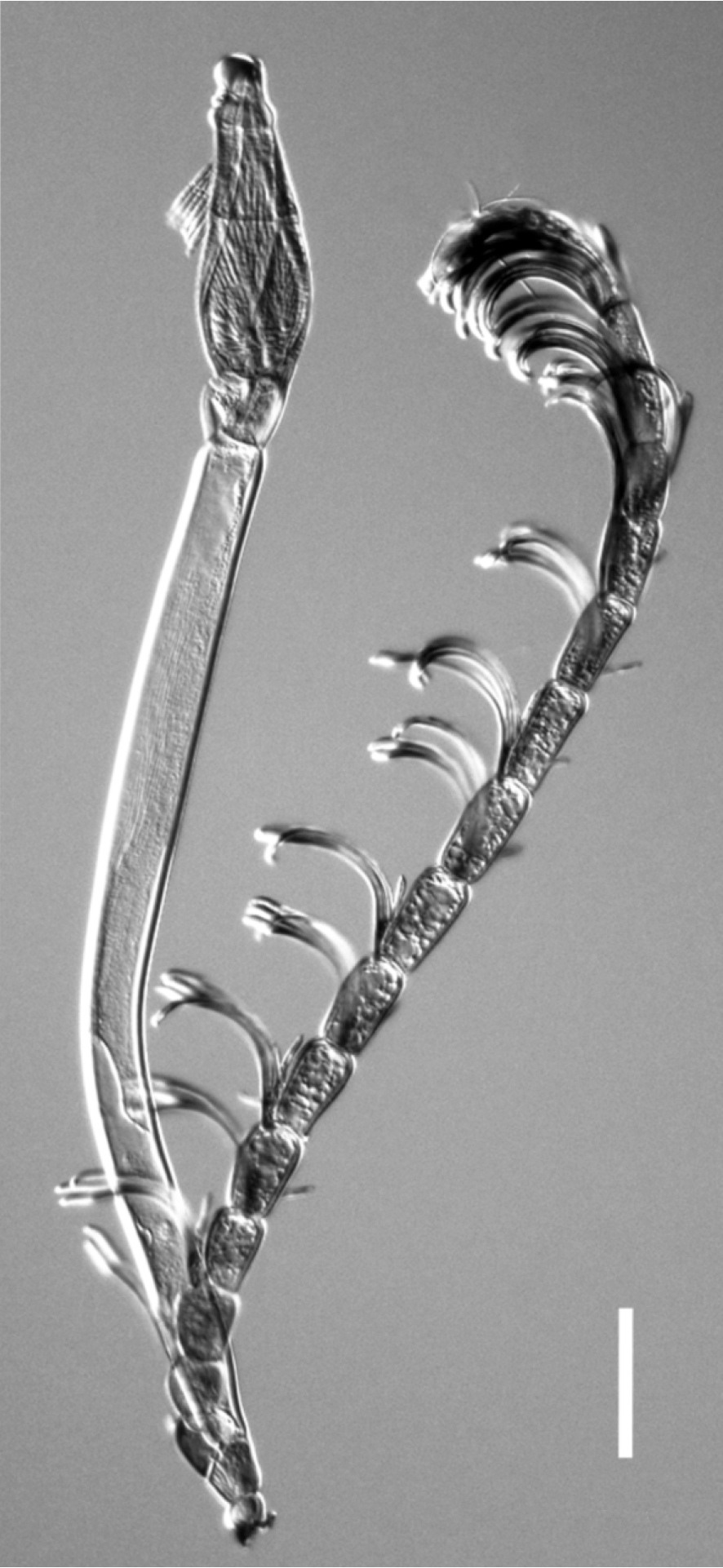
- Rhizomyces tschirnhausii W.Rossi & Feijen. Scale bar: 50 μm.

Scientific classification
- Kingdom: Fungi
- Division: Ascomycota
- Class: Laboulbeniomycetes
- Order: Laboulbeniales
- Family: Laboulbeniaceae
- Genus: Rhizomyces; Thaxt.

Type species
- Rhizomyces ctenophorus Thaxt.

= Rhizomyces =

Genus of fungi

Rhizomyces is a genus of fungi in the family Laboulbeniaceae. The genus contain 10 species.
