= Kyphomyces =

Scientific classification
- Kingdom: Fungi
- Division: Ascomycota
- Class: Laboulbeniomycetes
- Order: Laboulbeniales
- Family: Laboulbeniaceae
- Genus: Kyphomyces; I.I. Tav.

Type species
- Kyphomyces ansatus (Thaxt.) I.I. Tav.

Genus of fungi

Kyphomyces is a genus of fungi in the family Laboulbeniaceae. The genus contain 14 species.
