= Hydrophilomyces =

Scientific classification
- Kingdom: Fungi
- Division: Ascomycota
- Class: Laboulbeniomycetes
- Order: Laboulbeniales
- Family: Laboulbeniaceae
- Genus: Hydrophilomyces; Thaxt. (1908)

Type species
- Hydrophilomyces rhynchophorus (Thaxt.) Thaxt. (1908)

Genus of fungi

Hydrophilomyces is a genus of fungi in the family Laboulbeniaceae. It was circumscribed by American mycologist Roland Thaxter in 1908. The genus contain 12 species.

== Species ==
- Hydrophilomyces aduncus
- Hydrophilomyces arcuatus
- Hydrophilomyces atroseptatus
- Hydrophilomyces coelostomalis
- Hydrophilomyces coneglianensis
- Hydrophilomyces gracilis
- Hydrophilomyces hamatus
- Hydrophilomyces limnebii
- Hydrophilomyces lumbricoides
- Hydrophilomyces pusillus
- Hydrophilomyces rhynchophorus
- Hydrophilomyces rhytidopus
