= Carpophoromyces =

Scientific classification
- Kingdom: Fungi
- Division: Ascomycota
- Class: Laboulbeniomycetes
- Order: Laboulbeniales
- Family: Laboulbeniaceae
- Genus: Carpophoromyces; Thaxt.

Type species
- Carpophoromyces cybocephali Thaxt.

Genus of fungi

Carpophoromyces is a genus of fungi in the family Laboulbeniaceae. A monotypic genus, Capillistichus contains the single species Carpophoromyces cybocephali.
