= Arthrorhynchus =

Scientific classification
- Kingdom: Fungi
- Division: Ascomycota
- Class: Laboulbeniomycetes
- Order: Laboulbeniales
- Family: Laboulbeniaceae
- Genus: Arthrorhynchus; Kolen.

Type species
- Arthrorhynchus nycteribiae (Peyr.) Thaxt.

Genus of fungi

Arthrorhynchus is a genus of fungi in the family Laboulbeniaceae. The genus contain 3 species.
