= Histeridomyces =

Scientific classification
- Kingdom: Fungi
- Division: Ascomycota
- Class: Laboulbeniomycetes
- Order: Laboulbeniales
- Family: Laboulbeniaceae
- Genus: Histeridomyces; Thaxt.

Type species
- Histeridomyces ramosus Thaxt.

Genus of fungi

Histeridomyces is a genus of fungi in the family Laboulbeniaceae. The genus contain 6 species.
