= Monandromyces =

Scientific classification
- Kingdom: Fungi
- Division: Ascomycota
- Class: Laboulbeniomycetes
- Order: Laboulbeniales
- Family: Laboulbeniaceae
- Genus: Monandromyces; R.K. Benj.

Type species
- Monandromyces microveliae (Thaxt.) R.K. Benj.

Genus of fungi

Monandromyces is a genus of fungi in the family Laboulbeniaceae. The genus contains 11 species.
