= Smeringomyces =

Scientific classification
- Kingdom: Fungi
- Division: Ascomycota
- Class: Laboulbeniomycetes
- Order: Laboulbeniales
- Family: Laboulbeniaceae
- Genus: Smeringomyces; Thaxt.

Type species
- Smeringomyces anomalus (Thaxt.) Thaxt.

Genus of fungi

Smeringomyces is a genus of fungi in the family Laboulbeniaceae. The genus contain 4 species.
