= Limnaiomyces =

Scientific classification
- Kingdom: Fungi
- Division: Ascomycota
- Class: Laboulbeniomycetes
- Order: Laboulbeniales
- Family: Laboulbeniaceae
- Genus: Limnaiomyces; Thaxt.

Type species
- Limnaiomyces tropisterni Thaxt.

Genus of fungi

Limnaiomyces is a genus of fungi in the family Laboulbeniaceae. The genus contains 3 species.
