= Meionomyces =

Scientific classification
- Kingdom: Fungi
- Division: Ascomycota
- Class: Laboulbeniomycetes
- Order: Laboulbeniales
- Family: Laboulbeniaceae
- Genus: Meionomyces; Thaxt.

Type species
- Meionomyces asteni Thaxt.

Genus of fungi

Meionomyces is a genus of fungi in the family Laboulbeniaceae. The genus contain 6 species.
