= Rhizopodomyces =

Scientific classification
- Kingdom: Fungi
- Division: Ascomycota
- Class: Laboulbeniomycetes
- Order: Laboulbeniales
- Family: Laboulbeniaceae
- Genus: Rhizopodomyces; Thaxt.

Type species
- Rhizopodomyces merragatae Thaxt.

Genus of fungi

Rhizopodomyces is a genus of fungi in the family Laboulbeniaceae. The genus contain 7 species.
