= Blasticomyces =

Scientific classification
- Kingdom: Fungi
- Division: Ascomycota
- Class: Laboulbeniomycetes
- Order: Laboulbeniales
- Family: Laboulbeniaceae
- Genus: Blasticomyces; I.I. Tav.

Type species
- Blasticomyces lispini (Thaxt.) I.I. Tav.

Genus of fungi

Blasticomyces is a genus of fungi in the family Laboulbeniaceae. The genus contains 2 species.
