= Porophoromyces =

Scientific classification
- Kingdom: Fungi
- Division: Ascomycota
- Class: Laboulbeniomycetes
- Order: Laboulbeniales
- Family: Laboulbeniaceae
- Genus: Porophoromyces; Thaxt.

Type species
- Porophoromyces tmesiphori Thaxt.

Species
- P. formosanus P. tmesiphori

Genus of fungi

Porophoromyces is a genus of fungi in the family Laboulbeniaceae.
