= Camptomyces =

Scientific classification
- Domain: Eukaryota
- Kingdom: Fungi
- Division: Ascomycota
- Class: Laboulbeniomycetes
- Order: Laboulbeniales
- Family: Laboulbeniaceae
- Genus: Camptomyces; Thaxt.

Type species
- Camptomyces melanopus Thaxt.

Genus of fungi

Camptomyces is a genus of fungi in the family Laboulbeniaceae. The genus contain 8 species.
