= Distolomyces =

Scientific classification
- Kingdom: Fungi
- Division: Ascomycota
- Class: Laboulbeniomycetes
- Order: Laboulbeniales
- Family: Laboulbeniaceae
- Genus: Distolomyces; Thaxt.

Type species
- Distolomyces fijianus Thaxt.

Genus of fungi

Distolomyces is a genus of fungi in the family Laboulbeniaceae. The genus contain 3 species.
