= Eucantharomyces =

Scientific classification
- Kingdom: Fungi
- Division: Ascomycota
- Class: Laboulbeniomycetes
- Order: Laboulbeniales
- Family: Laboulbeniaceae
- Genus: Eucantharomyces; Thaxt.

Type species
- Eucantharomyces atrani Thaxt.

Genus of fungi

Eucantharomyces is a genus of fungi in the family Laboulbeniaceae. The genus contains 26 species.
