= Zodiomyces =

Scientific classification
- Kingdom: Fungi
- Division: Ascomycota
- Class: Laboulbeniomycetes
- Order: Laboulbeniales
- Family: Laboulbeniaceae
- Genus: Zodiomyces; Thaxt.

Type species
- Zodiomyces vorticellarius Thaxt.

Species
- Zodiomyces odae; Zodiomyces subseriatus; Zodiomyces vorticellarius

Genus of fungi

Zodiomyces is a genus of fungi in the family Laboulbeniaceae. The genus contain 3 species.
