= Stichomyces =

Scientific classification
- Kingdom: Fungi
- Division: Ascomycota
- Class: Laboulbeniomycetes
- Order: Laboulbeniales
- Family: Laboulbeniaceae
- Genus: Stichomyces; Thaxt.

Type species
- Stichomyces conosomatis Thaxt.

Genus of fungi

Stichomyces is a genus of fungi in the family Laboulbeniaceae. The genus contain 7 species.
