= Botryandromyces =

Scientific classification
- Kingdom: Fungi
- Division: Ascomycota
- Class: Laboulbeniomycetes
- Order: Laboulbeniales
- Family: Laboulbeniaceae
- Genus: Botryandromyces; I.I. Tav. & T. Majewski

Type species
- Botryandromyces heteroceri (Thaxt.) I.I. Tav. & T. Majewski

Genus of fungi

Botryandromyces is a genus of fungi in the family Laboulbeniaceae. The genus contain 2 species.
