= Polyascomyces =

Scientific classification
- Kingdom: Fungi
- Division: Ascomycota
- Class: Laboulbeniomycetes
- Order: Laboulbeniales
- Family: Laboulbeniaceae
- Genus: Polyascomyces; Thaxt.

Type species
- Polyascomyces trichophyae Thaxt.

Genus of fungi

Polyascomyces is a genus of fungi in the family Laboulbeniaceae. This is a monotypic genus, containing the single species Polyascomyces trichophyae.
