= Stemmatomyces =

Scientific classification
- Kingdom: Fungi
- Division: Ascomycota
- Class: Laboulbeniomycetes
- Order: Laboulbeniales
- Family: Laboulbeniaceae
- Genus: Stemmatomyces; Thaxt.

Type species
- Stemmatomyces anoplischii (Thaxt.) Thaxt.

Genus of fungi

Stemmatomyces is a genus of fungi in the family Laboulbeniaceae. The genus contain 3 species.
