= Gloeandromyces =

Scientific classification
- Kingdom: Fungi
- Division: Ascomycota
- Class: Laboulbeniomycetes
- Order: Laboulbeniales
- Family: Laboulbeniaceae
- Genus: Gloeandromyces; Thaxt. 1931

Type species
- Gloeandromyces streblae (Thaxt.) Thaxt. 1931

Species
- Gloeandromyces dickii Haelew. 2019; Gloeandromyces hilleri Haelew. & Pfliegler 2020; Gloeandromyces nycteribiidarum (Thaxt.) Thaxt. 1931; Gloeandromyces pageanus Haelew. 2017; Gloeandromyces streblae (Thaxt.) Thaxt. 1931

Genus of fungi

Gloeandromyces is a genus of fungi in the family Laboulbeniaceae. The genus contains five species. All species are associated with Neotropical bat flies (Diptera, Hippoboscoidea, Streblidae).
