= Symplectromyces =

Scientific classification
- Kingdom: Fungi
- Division: Ascomycota
- Class: Laboulbeniomycetes
- Order: Laboulbeniales
- Family: Laboulbeniaceae
- Genus: Symplectromyces; Thaxt.

Type species
- Symplectromyces vulgaris (Thaxt.) Thaxt.

Species
- S. lapponicus S. rarus S. vulgaris

Genus of fungi

Symplectromyces is a genus of fungi in the family Laboulbeniaceae.
