= Dioicomyces =

Scientific classification
- Kingdom: Fungi
- Division: Ascomycota
- Class: Laboulbeniomycetes
- Order: Laboulbeniales
- Family: Laboulbeniaceae
- Genus: Dioicomyces; Thaxt.

Type species
- Dioicomyces anthici Thaxt.

Genus of fungi

Dioicomyces is a genus of fungi in the family Laboulbeniaceae. The genus contain 32 species.
