= Tavaresiella =

Scientific classification
- Kingdom: Fungi
- Division: Ascomycota
- Class: Laboulbeniomycetes
- Order: Laboulbeniales
- Family: Euceratomycetaceae
- Genus: Tavaresiella; T. Majewski

Type species
- Tavaresiella hebri T. Majewski

Genus of fungi

Tavaresiella is a genus of fungi in the family Laboulbeniaceae. The genus contain 4 species.
