= Ilytheomyces =

Scientific classification
- Kingdom: Fungi
- Division: Ascomycota
- Class: Laboulbeniomycetes
- Order: Laboulbeniales
- Family: Laboulbeniaceae
- Genus: Ilytheomyces; Thaxt.

Type species
- Ilytheomyces elegans Thaxt.

Genus of fungi

Ilytheomyces is a genus of fungi in the family Laboulbeniaceae. The genus contain 15 species.
