= Diclonomyces =

Scientific classification
- Kingdom: Fungi
- Division: Ascomycota
- Class: Laboulbeniomycetes
- Order: Laboulbeniales
- Family: Laboulbeniaceae
- Genus: Diclonomyces; Thaxt.

Type species
- Diclonomyces eumicrophilus Thaxt.

Genus of fungi

Diclonomyces is a genus of fungi in the family Laboulbeniaceae. The genus contain 3 species.
