= Monoicomyces =

Scientific classification
- Kingdom: Fungi
- Division: Ascomycota
- Class: Laboulbeniomycetes
- Order: Laboulbeniales
- Family: Laboulbeniaceae
- Genus: Monoicomyces; Thaxt.

Type species
- Monoicomyces homalotae Thaxt.

Genus of fungi

Monoicomyces is a genus of fungi in the family Laboulbeniaceae. The genus contain 48 species.
