= Trenomyces =

Scientific classification
- Kingdom: Fungi
- Division: Ascomycota
- Class: Laboulbeniomycetes
- Order: Laboulbeniales
- Family: Laboulbeniaceae
- Genus: Trenomyces; Chatton & F. Picard

Type species
- Trenomyces histophtorus Chatton & F.Picard

Genus of fungi

Trenomyces is a genus of fungi in the family Laboulbeniaceae. The genus contain 11 species.
