= Asaphomyces =

Scientific classification
- Kingdom: Fungi
- Division: Ascomycota
- Class: Laboulbeniomycetes
- Order: Laboulbeniales
- Family: Laboulbeniaceae
- Genus: Asaphomyces; Thaxt.

Type species
- Asaphomyces cholevae Thaxt.

Genus of fungi

Asaphomyces is a genus of fungi in the family Laboulbeniaceae. The genus contain 4 species.
