= Peyritschiella =

Scientific classification
- Kingdom: Fungi
- Division: Ascomycota
- Class: Laboulbeniomycetes
- Order: Laboulbeniales
- Family: Laboulbeniaceae
- Genus: Peyritschiella; Thaxt.

Type species
- Peyritschiella curvata Thaxt.

Genus of fungi

Peyritschiella is a genus of fungi in the family Laboulbeniaceae. The genus contain 47 species.

The genus name of Peyritschiella is in honour of Johann Joseph Peyritsch (1835–1889), who was an Austrian physician and botanist born in Völkermarkt.

The genus was circumscribed by Roland Thaxter in Proc. Amer. Acad. Arts Sci. vol.25 on page 8 in 1890.

== Species ==
As accepted by Species Fungorum;

- Peyritschiella amazonica Thaxt. (1900)
- Peyritschiella angolensis (Thaxt.) I.I. Tav. (1985)
- Peyritschiella anisopleura (Speg.) Speg. (1917)
- Peyritschiella argentinensis (Speg.) I.I. Tav. (1985)
- Peyritschiella arimensis (Thaxt.) I.I. Tav. (1985)
- Peyritschiella australiensis (Thaxt.) I.I. Tav. (1985)
- Peyritschiella belonuchi (Thaxt.) I.I. Tav. (1985)
- Peyritschiella bicolor (Thaxt.) I.I. Tav. (1985)
- Peyritschiella bifida (Thaxt.) I.I. Tav. (1985)
- Peyritschiella biformis (Thaxt.) I.I. Tav. (1985)
- Peyritschiella cafiana (Thaxt.) I.I. Tav. (1985)
- Peyritschiella chilensis (Thaxt.) I.I. Tav. (1985)
- Peyritschiella clivinae Thaxt. (1931)
- Peyritschiella curvata Thaxt. (1892)
- Peyritschiella dubia (Thaxt.) I.I. Tav. (1985)
- Peyritschiella eulissi (Thaxt.) I.I. Tav. (1985)
- Peyritschiella exilis (Thaxt.) I.I. Tav. (1985)
- Peyritschiella formosana K. Sugiy. (1982)
- Peyritschiella fumosa (Thaxt.) I.I. Tav. (1985)
- Peyritschiella furcifera (Thaxt.) I.I. Tav. (1985)
- Peyritschiella geminata Thaxt. (1894)
- Peyritschiella gracilis (Thaxt.) I.I. Tav. (1985)
- Peyritschiella heinemanniana De Kesel (1999)
- Peyritschiella homalotae (Thaxt.) I.I. Tav. (1985)
- Peyritschiella hybrida (Thaxt.) I.I. Tav. (1985)
- Peyritschiella infecta (Thaxt.) I.I. Tav. (1985)
- Peyritschiella insignis (Thaxt.) I.I. Tav. (1985)
- Peyritschiella japonica (Terada) I.I. Tav. (1985)
- Peyritschiella javana (Thaxt.) I.I. Tav. (1985)
- Peyritschiella lampropygi Thaxt. (1931)
- Peyritschiella lepida (Thaxt.) I.I. Tav. (1985)
- Peyritschiella madagascariensis (Thaxt.) I.I. Tav. (1985)
- Peyritschiella mexicana (Thaxt.) I.I. Tav. (1985)
- Peyritschiella minima Thaxt. (1891)
- Peyritschiella nigrescens Thaxt. (1894)
- Peyritschiella okumae K. Sugiy. (1982)
- Peyritschiella oxyteli (Cépède & F. Picard) Santam. (2021)
- Peyritschiella pallida (Thaxt.) I.I. Tav. (1985)
- Peyritschiella peruviana (Thaxt.) I.I. Tav. (1985)
- Peyritschiella pretiosa (Thaxt.) I.I. Tav. (1985)
- Peyritschiella princeps (Thaxt.) I.I. Tav. (1985)
- Peyritschiella protea Thaxt. (1900)
- Peyritschiella quedii (Scheloske) I.I. Tav. (1985)
- Peyritschiella staphylini (Thaxt.) I.I. Tav. (1985)
- Peyritschiella subinaequilatera (Speg.) Speg. (1917)
- Peyritschiella thyreocephali (Thaxt.) I.I. Tav. (1985)
- Peyritschiella trichodomiae Thaxt. (1931)
- Peyritschiella vulgata (Thaxt.) I.I. Tav. (1985)
- Peyritschiella xanthopygi Thaxt. (1901)
- Peyritschiella xyricola Thaxt. (1931)
