= Diphymyces =

Scientific classification
- Kingdom: Fungi
- Division: Ascomycota
- Class: Laboulbeniomycetes
- Order: Laboulbeniales
- Family: Laboulbeniaceae
- Genus: Diphymyces; I.I. Tav.

Type species
- Diphymyces appendiculatus (Thaxt.) I.I. Tav.

Genus of fungi

Diphymyces is a genus of fungi in the family Laboulbeniaceae. The genus contain 7 species.
