= Cupulomyces =

Scientific classification
- Kingdom: Fungi
- Division: Ascomycota
- Class: Laboulbeniomycetes
- Order: Laboulbeniales
- Family: Laboulbeniaceae
- Genus: Cupulomyces; R.K. Benj.

Type species
- Cupulomyces lasiochili (Thaxt.) R.K. Benj.

Genus of fungi

Cupulomyces is a genus of fungi in the family Laboulbeniaceae. A monotypic genus, Cupulomyces contains the single species Cupulomyces lasiochili.
