= Neohaplomyces =

Scientific classification
- Kingdom: Fungi
- Division: Ascomycota
- Class: Laboulbeniomycetes
- Order: Laboulbeniales
- Family: Laboulbeniaceae
- Genus: Neohaplomyces; R.K. Benj.

Type species
- Neohaplomyces medonalis R.K. Benj.

Genus of fungi

Neohaplomyces is a genus of fungi in the family Laboulbeniaceae. The genus contains 3 species:

- Neohaplomyces medonalis
- Neohaplomyces cubensis
- Neohaplomyces neomedonalis
