= Sandersoniomyces =

Scientific classification
- Kingdom: Fungi
- Division: Ascomycota
- Class: Laboulbeniomycetes
- Order: Laboulbeniales
- Family: Laboulbeniaceae
- Genus: Sandersoniomyces; R.K. Benj.

Type species
- Sandersoniomyces divaricatus R.K. Benj.

Genus of fungi

Sandersoniomyces is a genus of fungi in the family Laboulbeniaceae.

== Species ==
A monotypic genus, it contains the single species Sandersoniomyces divaricatus R.K. Benj. (1968).

== Distribution ==
It is found on Quedius beetles in California.

The genus was circumscribed by Richard Keith Benjamin in Aliso vol.6 (4) on page 1 in 1968.

The genus name of Sandersoniomyces is in honour of Milton William Sanderson (1910–2012), an American entomologist who studied beetles and Phyllophaga (scarab beetles) and worked with the Illinois Natural History Survey.
