= Autophagomyces =

Scientific classification
- Kingdom: Fungi
- Division: Ascomycota
- Class: Laboulbeniomycetes
- Order: Laboulbeniales
- Family: Laboulbeniaceae
- Genus: Autophagomyces; Thaxt.

Type species
- Autophagomyces platensis Thaxt.

Genus of fungi

Autophagomyces is a genus of fungi in the family Laboulbeniaceae. The genus contain 24 species.
