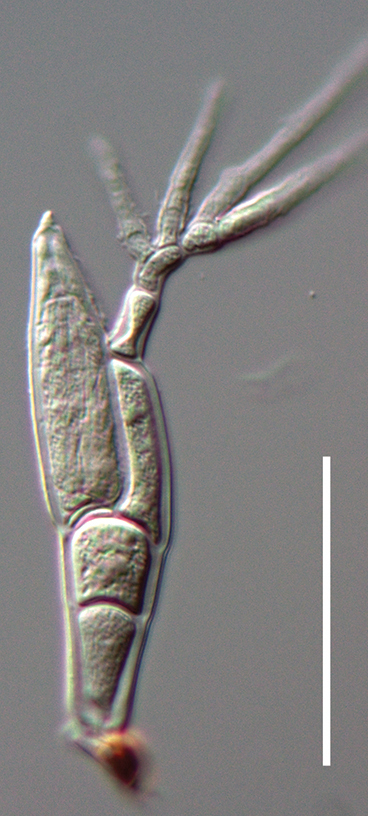
- Troglomyces twitteri

Scientific classification
- Kingdom: Fungi
- Division: Ascomycota
- Class: Laboulbeniomycetes
- Order: Laboulbeniales
- Family: Laboulbeniaceae
- Genus: Troglomyces; S. Colla

Type species
- Troglomyces manfredii S. Colla

= Troglomyces =

Genus of fungi

Troglomyces is a genus of fungi in the family Laboulbeniaceae which parasitize millipedes and insects. As of 2020, it contains 9 known species: bilabiatus, botryandrus, dioicus, manfredii, pusillus, rossii, tetralabiatus, triandrus, and twitteri.
