= Joseph Alexandre Laboulbène =

French physician and entomologist

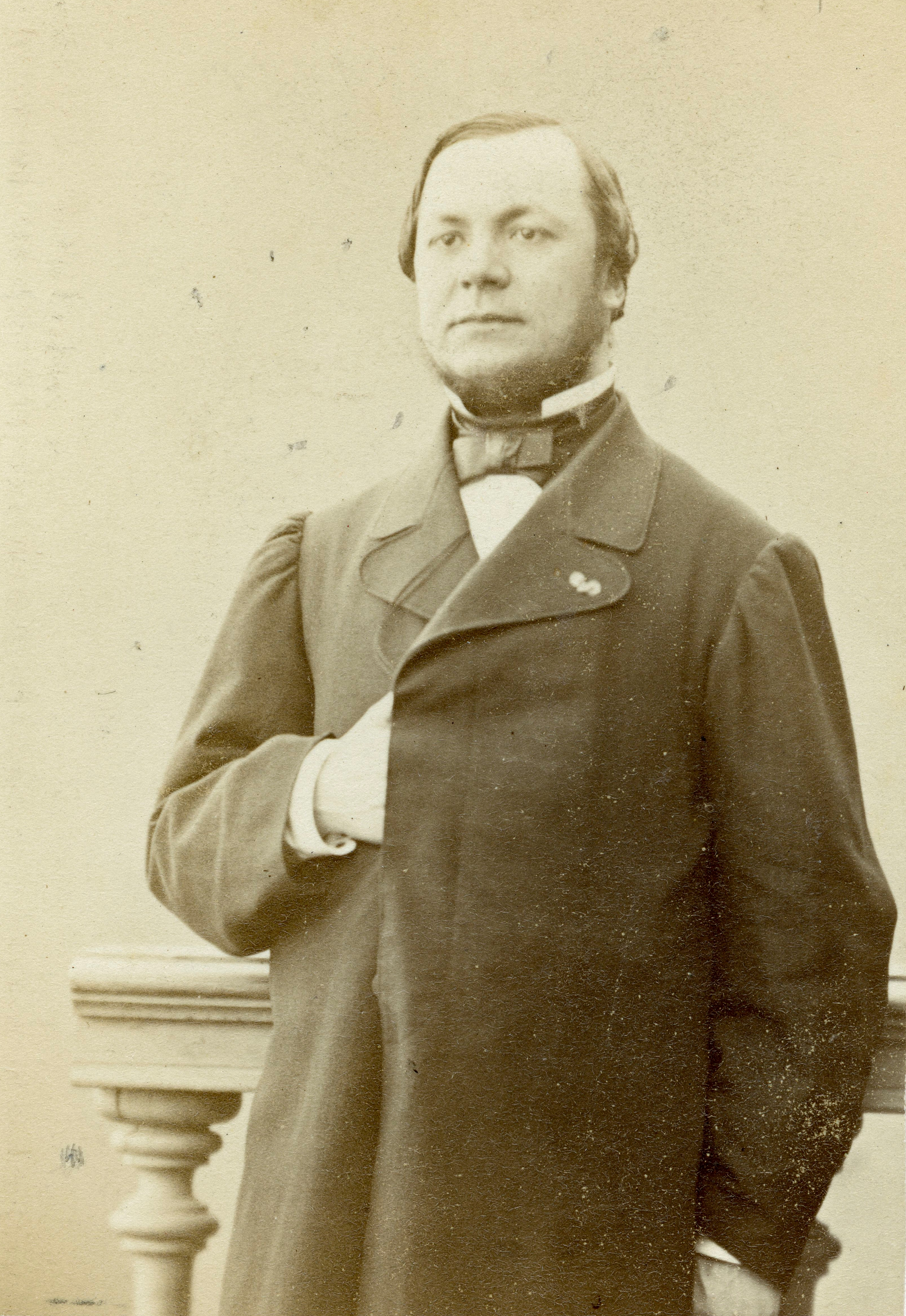

Joseph Alexandre Laboulbène (25 August 1825 Agen – 7 December 1898, Paris) was a French physician and entomologist. A friend of the entomologist Jean-Marie Léon Dufour (1780–1865), he studied medicine in the University of Paris and was awarded the title Docteur in 1854. He taught in the medical faculty until 1879. Laboulbène was interested in harmful insects notably in the Order Diptera. The order of mushrooms Laboulbeniales, is dedicated to him, by Engler in 1898.

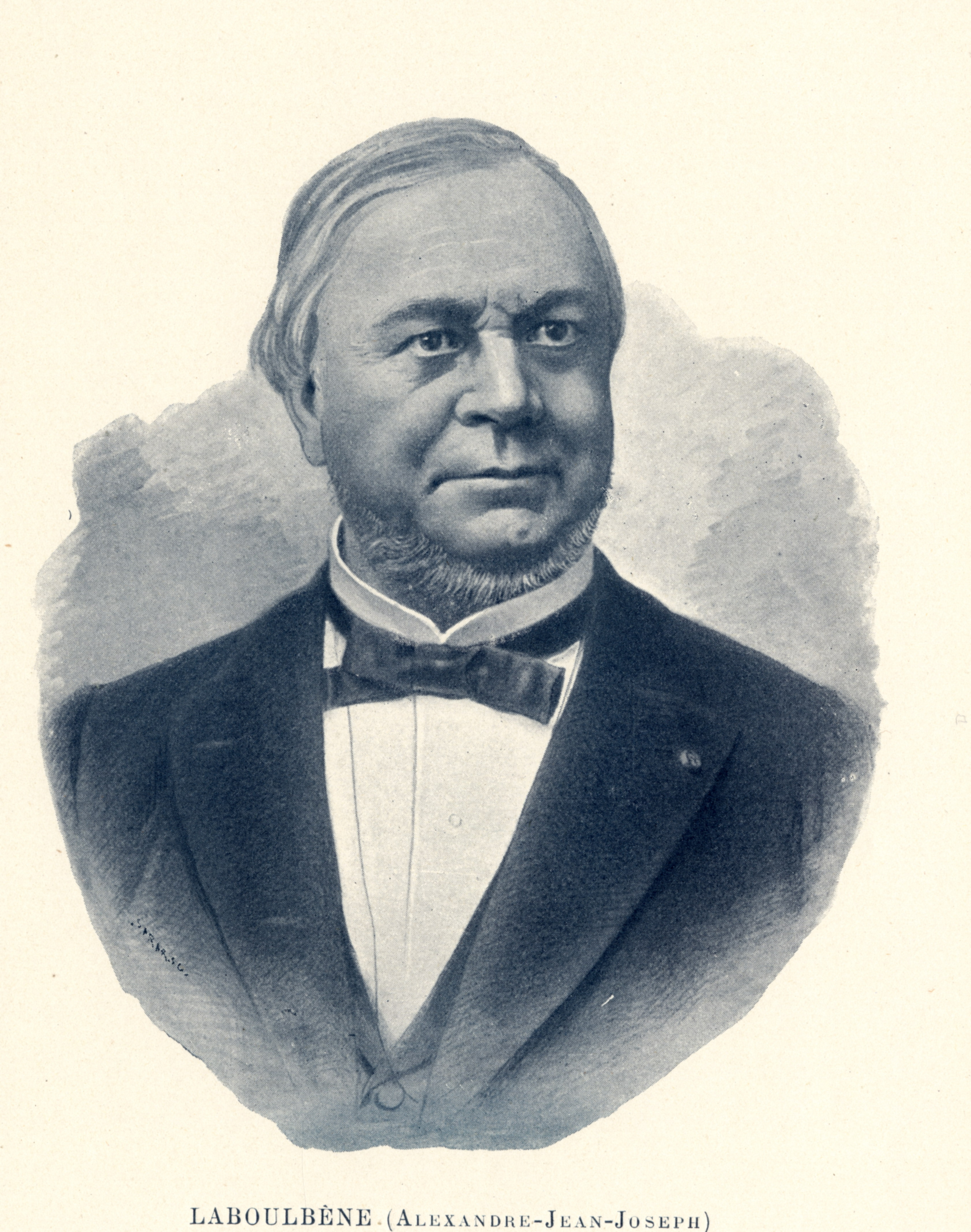
Laboulbene Alexandre

In 1853, Laboulbenia which is a genus of fungi in the family Laboulbeniaceae, was named in his honour.

== Works ==
- with Léon Fairmaire (1854). Faune Entomologique Française. Coleoptera. Paris : Deyrolle Vol. 1 665 pp also Felix Malteste et Cie., Paris?. (1854).
- 1874) Notices nécrologique sur le docteur Antoine Dours, in: Annales de la Société Entomologique de France, Vol. 43, pp. 351–358

== Sources ==
- Jean Lhoste (1987). Les Entomologistes français. 1750–1950. INRA Éditions : 351 p.
- Translation from French Wikipedia.
