= Balazucia =

Scientific classification
- Kingdom: Fungi
- Division: Ascomycota
- Class: Laboulbeniomycetes
- Order: Laboulbeniales
- Family: Laboulbeniaceae
- Genus: Balazucia; R.K. Benj.

Type species
- Balazucia bilateralis R.K. Benj.

Genus of fungi

Balazucia is a genus of fungi in the family Laboulbeniaceae. The genus contains two species.
