= Triceromyces =

Scientific classification
- Kingdom: Fungi
- Division: Ascomycota
- Class: Laboulbeniomycetes
- Order: Laboulbeniales
- Family: Laboulbeniaceae
- Genus: Triceromyces; T. Majewski

Type species
- Triceromyces balazucii T. Majewski

Genus of fungi

Triceromyces is a genus of fungi in the family Laboulbeniaceae. The genus contain 5 species.
