= Euceratomyces =

Scientific classification
- Kingdom: Fungi
- Division: Ascomycota
- Class: Laboulbeniomycetes
- Order: Laboulbeniales
- Family: Euceratomycetaceae
- Genus: Euceratomyces; Thaxt.

Type species
- Euceratomyces terrestris Thaxt.

Genus of fungi

Euceratomyces is a genus of fungi in the family Euceratomycetaceae. A monotypic genus, it contains the single species Euceratomyces terrestris.
