= Homaromyces =

Scientific classification
- Kingdom: Fungi
- Division: Ascomycota
- Class: Laboulbeniomycetes
- Order: Laboulbeniales
- Family: Laboulbeniaceae
- Genus: Homaromyces; R.K. Benj.

Type species
- Homaromyces epieri R.K. Benj.

Genus of fungi

Homaromyces is a genus of fungi in the family Laboulbeniaceae. A monotypic genus, Homaromyces contains the single species Homaromyces epieri.
