= Colonomyces =

Scientific classification
- Kingdom: Fungi
- Division: Ascomycota
- Class: Laboulbeniomycetes
- Order: Laboulbeniales
- Family: Euceratomycetaceae
- Genus: Colonomyces; R.K. Benj.

Type species
- Colonomyces appendiculatus R.K. Benj.

Genus of fungi

Colonomyces is a genus of fungi in the family Euceratomycetaceae. A monotypic genus, it contains the single species Colonomyces appendiculatus.
