= Capillistichus =

Scientific classification
- Kingdom: Fungi
- Division: Ascomycota
- Class: Laboulbeniomycetes
- Order: Laboulbeniales
- Family: Laboulbeniaceae
- Genus: Capillistichus; Santam.

Type species
- Capillistichus tenellus Santam.

Genus of fungi

Capillistichus is a genus of fungi in the family Laboulbeniaceae. A monotypic genus, Capillistichus contains the single species Capillistichus tenellus.
