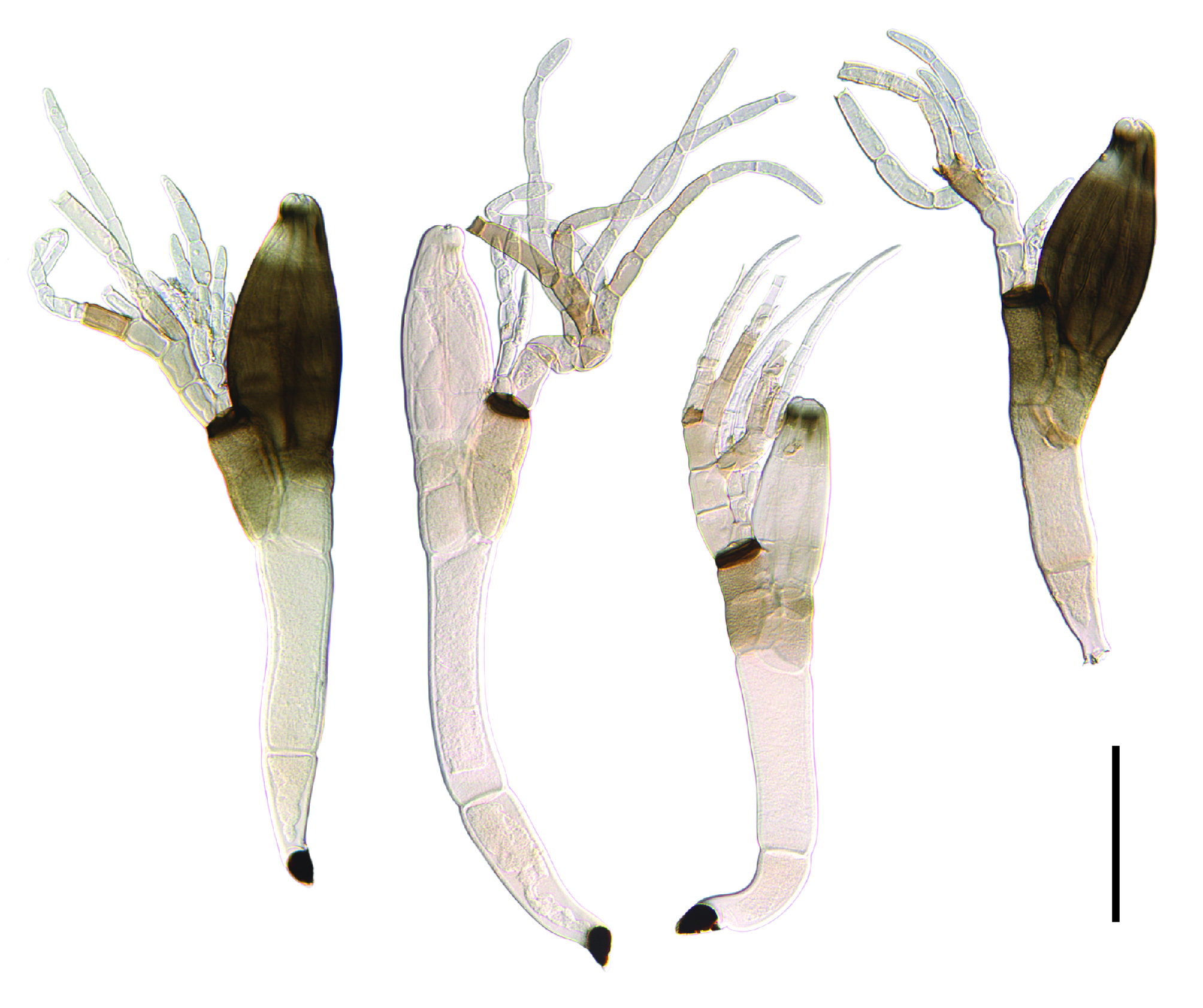
- Four mature thalli of Laboulbenia quarantenae

Scientific classification
- Domain: Eukaryota
- Kingdom: Fungi
- Division: Ascomycota
- Class: Laboulbeniomycetes
- Order: Laboulbeniales
- Family: Laboulbeniaceae
- Genus: Laboulbenia
- Species: L. quarantenae

Binomial name
- Laboulbenia quarantenae Haelew. & De Kesel (2020)

= Laboulbenia quarantenae =

Species of fungus

Laboulbenia quarantenae is a species of ectoparasitic fungi. It is closely related to Laboulbenia vulgaris, but differs enough in its DNA to make it a separate species. The species was discovered in 2020 on its host Bembidion biguttatum, a small ground beetle (Carabidae), in the Botanic Garden Meise. It was discovered by Danny Haelewaters and André De Kesel, who named it "quarantenae", as they formally described it during the quarantine measures in their respective countries, the United States and Belgium.

== See also ==
- List of species named after the COVID-19 pandemic
