= Pselaphidomyces =

Scientific classification
- Kingdom: Fungi
- Division: Ascomycota
- Class: Laboulbeniomycetes
- Order: Laboulbeniales
- Family: Laboulbeniaceae
- Genus: Pselaphidomyces; Speg.

Type species
- Pselaphidomyces pselapti Speg.

Genus of fungi

Pselaphidomyces is a genus of fungi in the family Laboulbeniaceae. A monotypic genus, it contains the single species Pselaphidomyces pselapti.
