= Columnomyces =

Scientific classification
- Kingdom: Fungi
- Division: Ascomycota
- Class: Laboulbeniomycetes
- Order: Laboulbeniales
- Family: Laboulbeniaceae
- Genus: Columnomyces; R.K. Benj.

Type species
- Columnomyces ptomaphagi R.K. Benj.

Genus of fungi

Columnomyces is a genus of fungi in the family Laboulbeniaceae. A monotypic genus, it contains the single species Columnomyces ptomaphagi.
