= Filariomyces =

Scientific classification
- Kingdom: Fungi
- Division: Ascomycota
- Class: Laboulbeniomycetes
- Order: Laboulbeniales
- Family: Laboulbeniaceae
- Genus: Filariomyces; Shanor

Type species
- Filariomyces forficulae Shanor

Genus of fungi

Filariomyces is a genus of fungi in the family Laboulbeniaceae. A monotypic genus, Filariomyces contains the single species Filariomyces forficulae.
