= Osoriomyces =

Scientific classification
- Kingdom: Fungi
- Division: Ascomycota
- Class: Laboulbeniomycetes
- Order: Laboulbeniales
- Family: Laboulbeniaceae
- Genus: Osoriomyces; Terada

Type species
- Osoriomyces rhizophorus Terada

Genus of fungi

Osoriomyces is a genus of fungi in the family Laboulbeniaceae. A monotypic genus. it contains the single species Osoriomyces rhizophorus.
