= Scepastocarpus =

Scientific classification
- Kingdom: Fungi
- Division: Ascomycota
- Class: Laboulbeniomycetes
- Order: Laboulbeniales
- Family: Laboulbeniaceae
- Genus: Scepastocarpus; Santam.

Type species
- Scepastocarpus peritheciiformis Santam.

Genus of fungi

Scepastocarpus is a genus of fungi in the family Laboulbeniaceae. A monotypic genus, it contains the single species Scepastocarpus peritheciiformis.
