= Siemaszkoa =

Scientific classification
- Kingdom: Fungi
- Division: Ascomycota
- Class: Laboulbeniomycetes
- Order: Laboulbeniales
- Family: Laboulbeniaceae
- Genus: Siemaszkoa; I.I. Tav. & Maj.

Type species
- Siemaszkoa flexa (T. Majewski) I.I. Tav. & T. Majewski

Genus of fungi

Siemaszkoa is a genus of fungi in the family Laboulbeniaceae. The genus contain 7 species.

The genus was circumscribed by Isabelle Irene Tavares and Tomasz Majewski in Mycotaxon vol.3 (2) on page 202 in 1976.

The genus name of Siemaszkoa is in honour of Janina Siemaszko (1895–1968), who was a Polish botanist and mycologist, was also interested in Virology and Entomology.

== Species ==
As accepted by Species Fungorum;

- Siemaszkoa annae (T. Majewski) I.I. Tav. & T. Majewski (1976)
- Siemaszkoa fennica Huldén (1983)
- Siemaszkoa flexa (T. Majewski) I.I. Tav. & T. Majewski (1976)
- Siemaszkoa ptenidii (Scheloske) I.I. Tav. & T. Majewski (1976)
- Siemaszkoa pusillima (Speg.) I.I. Tav. (1981)
- Siemaszkoa ramificans T. Majewski (1991)
- Siemaszkoa valida T. Majewski (1991)
