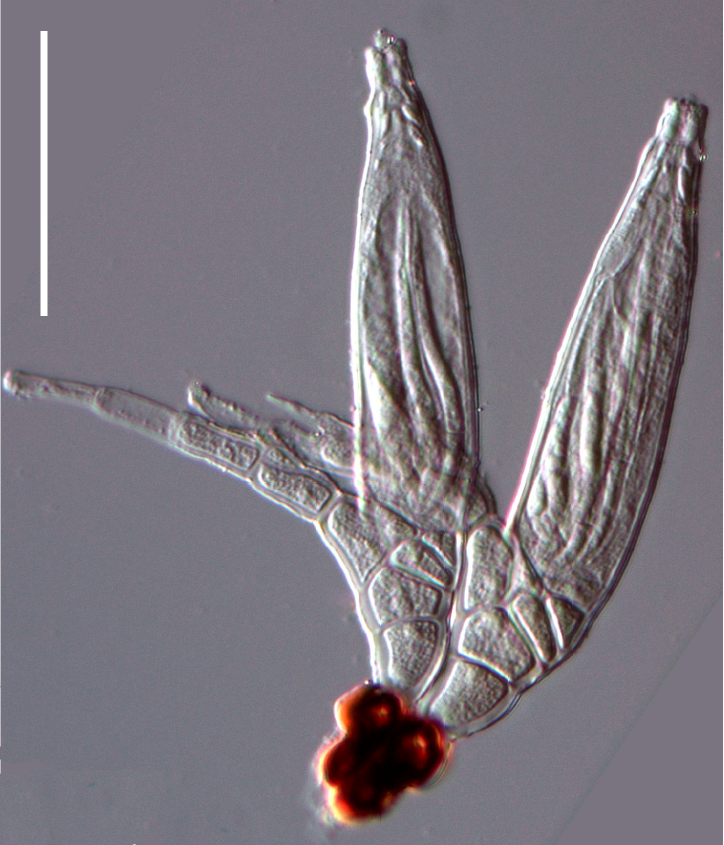
- Diplopodomyces coronatus

Scientific classification
- Kingdom: Fungi
- Division: Ascomycota
- Class: Laboulbeniomycetes
- Order: Laboulbeniales
- Family: Laboulbeniaceae
- Genus: Diplopodomyces; W. Rossi & Balazuc

Type species
- Diplopodomyces callipodos W. Rossi & Balazuc

= Diplopodomyces =

Genus of fungi

Diplopodomyces is a genus of fungi in the family Laboulbeniaceae. It contains six species, all found externally on millipedes.

Species:

- Diplopodomyces callipodos
- Diplopodomyces coronatus
- Diplopodomyces liguliphorus
- Diplopodomyces lusitanipodos
- Diplopodomyces ramosus
- Diplopodomyces veneris
