= Phalacrichomyces =

Scientific classification
- Kingdom: Fungi
- Division: Ascomycota
- Class: Laboulbeniomycetes
- Order: Laboulbeniales
- Family: Laboulbeniaceae
- Genus: Phalacrichomyces; R.K. Benjamin

Type species
- Phalacrichomyces normalis R.K. Benj.

Genus of fungi

Phalacrichomyces is a genus of fungi in the family Laboulbeniaceae. The genus contain 2 species.
