= Johann Joseph Peyritsch =

Austrian physician and botanist (1835–1889)

Johann Joseph Peyritsch (25 October 1835 – 14 March 1889) was a medical doctor and botanist born in Völkermarkt. He was from Austria-Hungary.

In 1864 he earned his medical doctorate from Vienna, and served as Naval physician at Pola from 1864-1866. From 1866 to 1871 he was associated with Vienna General Hospital. He later served as custos at the Naturhistorisches Museum in Vienna. In 1878, succeeded Anton Kerner von Marilaun, he became professor of botany at the University of Innsbruck, a position he maintained until his death in 1889.

He was editor of Heinrich Wilhelm Schott's celebrated monograph on aroids, Aroideae Maximilianae, and with Theodor Kotschy (1813–1866), was co-author of Plantae Tinneanae, a book describing flora collected on the Tinne expedition to Sudan.

As a taxonomist, he described numerous plants from the botanical families Celastraceae and Erythroxylaceae. In the field of mycology, he held a special interest in the fungal order Laboulbeniales. The plant genus Peyritschia from the family Poaceae was named in his honor by Eugène Pierre Nicolas Fournier in 1881. Then in 1890, Roland Thaxter named a fungal genus Peyritschiella (in the family Laboulbeniaceae) after him.

== External sources ==
- Lexikon deutschsprachiger Bryologen by Jan-Peter Frahm & Jens Eggers, (biography in German)
- International Aroid Society, The Botanical Art of Schott's Aroideae Maximilianae
