= Sugiyamaemyces =

Scientific classification
- Kingdom: Fungi
- Division: Ascomycota
- Class: Laboulbeniomycetes
- Order: Laboulbeniales
- Family: Laboulbeniaceae
- Genus: Sugiyamaemyces; I. Tavares & Balazuc

Type species
- Sugiyamaemyces oroussetii I.I. Tav. & Balazuc

Genus of fungi

Sugiyamaemyces is a genus of fungi in the family Laboulbeniaceae. A monotypic genus, it contains the single species Sugiyamaemyces oroussetii.
