= Corylophomyces =

Scientific classification
- Kingdom: Fungi
- Division: Ascomycota
- Class: Laboulbeniomycetes
- Order: Laboulbeniales
- Family: Laboulbeniaceae
- Genus: Corylophomyces; R.K. Benj.

Type species
- Corylophomyces sericoderi (Santam.) R.K. Benj.

Genus of fungi

Corylophomyces is a genus of fungi in the family Laboulbeniaceae. The genus contain 5 species.
