= Triainomyces =

Scientific classification
- Kingdom: Fungi
- Division: Ascomycota
- Class: Laboulbeniomycetes
- Order: Laboulbeniales
- Family: Laboulbeniaceae
- Genus: Triainomyces; W. Rossi & A. Weir

Type species
- Triainomyces hollowayanus W. Rossi & A. Weir

Genus of fungi

Triainomyces is a genus of fungi in the family Laboulbeniaceae. A monotypic genus, it contains the single species Triainomyces hollowayanus.
