= Fanniomyces =

Scientific classification
- Kingdom: Fungi
- Division: Ascomycota
- Class: Laboulbeniomycetes
- Order: Laboulbeniales
- Family: Laboulbeniaceae
- Genus: Fanniomyces; Maj.

Type species
- Fanniomyces ceratophorus (Whisler) T. Majewski

Genus of fungi

Fanniomyces is a genus of fungi in the family Laboulbeniaceae. The genus contains two species.
