= Peyerimhoffiella =

Scientific classification
- Kingdom: Fungi
- Division: Ascomycota
- Class: Laboulbeniomycetes
- Order: Laboulbeniales
- Family: Laboulbeniaceae
- Genus: Peyerimhoffiella; Maire

Type species
- Peyerimhoffiella elegans Maire

Genus of fungi

Peyerimhoffiella is a genus of fungi in the family Laboulbeniaceae. A monotypic genus, it contains the single species Peyerimhoffiella elegans.
