= Parvomyces =

Scientific classification
- Kingdom: Fungi
- Division: Ascomycota
- Class: Laboulbeniomycetes
- Order: Laboulbeniales
- Family: Laboulbeniaceae
- Genus: Parvomyces; Santam.

Type species
- Parvomyces merophysiae Santam.

Genus of fungi

Parvomyces is a genus of fungi in the family Laboulbeniaceae. A monotypic genus, it contains the single species Parvomyces merophysiae.
