= Pseudoecteinomyces =

Scientific classification
- Kingdom: Fungi
- Division: Ascomycota
- Class: Laboulbeniomycetes
- Order: Laboulbeniales
- Family: Euceratomycetaceae
- Genus: Pseudoecteinomyces; W. Rossi

Type species
- Pseudoecteinomyces zuphiicola (Speg.) W. Rossi

Genus of fungi

Pseudoecteinomyces is a genus of fungi in the family Euceratomycetaceae. A monotypic genus, it contains the single species Pseudoecteinomyces zuphiicola.
