= Cochliomyces =

Scientific classification
- Kingdom: Fungi
- Division: Ascomycota
- Class: Laboulbeniomycetes
- Order: Laboulbeniales
- Family: Euceratomycetaceae
- Genus: Cochliomyces; Speg.

Type species
- Cochliomyces argentinensis Speg.

Genus of fungi

Cochliomyces is a genus of fungi in the family Euceratomycetaceae.
