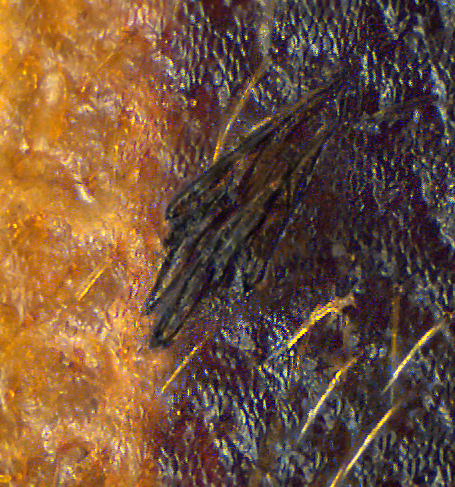
- Styphlomerus placidus (Peringuey, 1896) Elytra with Laboulbenia sp.

Scientific classification
- Domain: Eukaryota
- Kingdom: Fungi
- Division: Ascomycota
- Class: Laboulbeniomycetes
- Order: Laboulbeniales
- Family: Laboulbeniaceae
- Genus: Laboulbenia; Mont. & C.P.Robin (1853)

Type species
- Laboulbenia rougetii Mont. & C.P.Robin (1853)

Synonyms
- Ceraiomyces Thaxt. (1901); Eumisgomyces Speg. (1912); Laboulbeniella Speg. (1912); Schizolaboulbenia Middelh. (1957)

= Laboulbenia =

Genus of fungi

Laboulbenia is a genus of fungi in the family Laboulbeniaceae.

The genus name of Laboulbenia is in honour of Joseph Alexandre Laboulbène (1825–1898), who was a French physician and entomologist.

The genus was circumscribed by Jean Pierre François Camille Montagne and Charles Philippe Robin in C.P. Robin 'Histoire naturelle des Végétaux Parasites' (Paris) on page 622 in 1853.

Being ectoparasitic on a diverse assemblage of arthropods, the majority in insects, specially beetles and flies, and a few arachnids (mites) and millipedes, members of this genus show a rather high level of host specificity. They cause little, if any, damage to their hosts. The genus contains around 600 species.

== Selected species ==
- Laboulbenia quarantenae
- Laboulbenia slackensis
