= Euzodiomyces =

Scientific classification
- Kingdom: Fungi
- Division: Ascomycota
- Class: Laboulbeniomycetes
- Order: Laboulbeniales
- Family: Euceratomycetaceae
- Genus: Euzodiomyces; Thaxt.

Type species
- Euzodiomyces lathrobii Thaxt.

Genus of fungi

Euzodiomyces is a genus of fungi in the family Euceratomycetaceae.
