= Dimeromyces =

Scientific classification
- Domain: Eukaryota
- Kingdom: Fungi
- Division: Ascomycota
- Class: Laboulbeniomycetes
- Order: Laboulbeniales
- Family: Laboulbeniaceae
- Genus: Dimeromyces; Thaxt.

Type species
- Dimeromyces africanus Thaxt.

Genus of fungi

Dimeromyces is a genus of fungi in the family Laboulbeniaceae. The genus contain 109 species.
