= Cyperus colymbetes =

Conservation status
- Least Concern (IUCN 3.1)

Scientific classification
- Kingdom: Plantae
- Clade: Tracheophytes
- Clade: Angiosperms
- Clade: Monocots
- Clade: Commelinids
- Order: Poales
- Family: Cyperaceae
- Genus: Cyperus
- Species: C. colymbetes

Binomial name
- Cyperus colymbetes Kotschy & Peyr.

Synonyms
- Anosporum colymbetes (Kotschy & Peyr.) Boeckeler

Species of sedge

Cyperus colymbetes is a species of sedge that is native to eastern parts of Africa.

== See also ==
- List of Cyperus species
