= M. japonica =

M. japonica may refer to:

- Mahonia japonica, a medium-sized shrub species native to northeastern China
- Majewskia japonica, a fungus species
- Mauremys japonica, the Japanese pond turtle, a turtle species endemic to Japan
- Melibe japonica, a sea slug species
- Meloimorpha japonica, the suzumushi or bell cricket, an insect species
- Monocentris japonica, a pinecone fish species found in the tropical Indo-West Pacific oceans
- Morula japonica, a sea snail species
- Muscina japonica, a fly species in the genus Muscina
- Myrmarachne japonica, a jumping spider species in the genus Myrmarachne found in Russia, China, Korea, Taiwan and Japan

== Synonyms ==
- Melia japonica, a synonym for Melia azedarach, the Persian lilac, white cedar, chinaberry, bead tree, lunumidella, Ceylon cedar and malai vembu, a deciduous tree species native to India, southern China and Australia
- Meristotheca japonica, a synonym for Meristotheca papulosa, the jiguancai or tosaka-nori, a red alga species popular as a sea vegetable in Taiwan and in Japan
- Moroteuthis japonica, a synonym for Moroteuthis robusta, the robust clubhook squid, a squid species

== See also ==
- Japonica (disambiguation)
