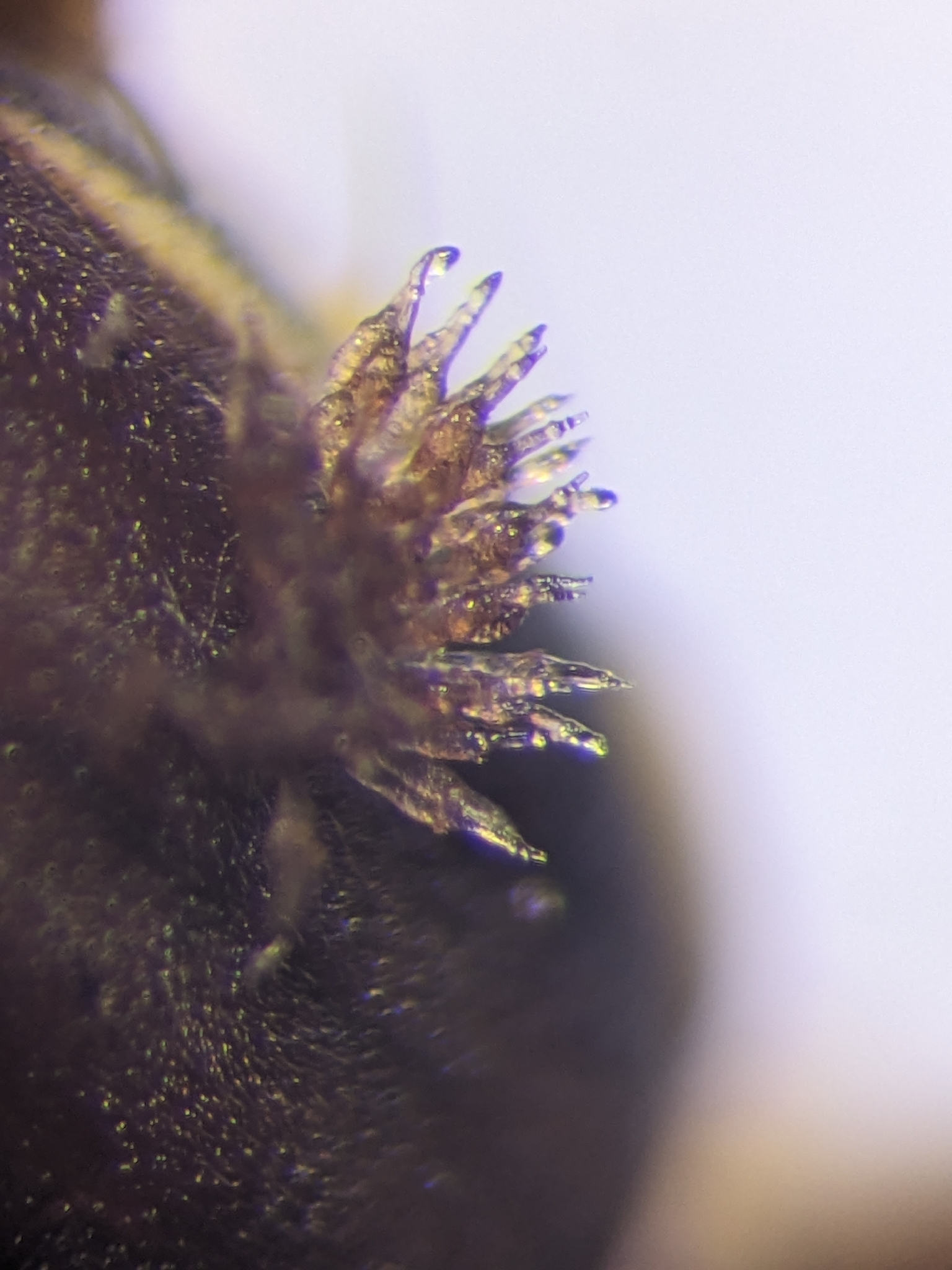
- On Bactrocera tryoni

Scientific classification
- Kingdom: Fungi
- Division: Ascomycota
- Class: Laboulbeniomycetes
- Order: Laboulbeniales
- Family: Laboulbeniaceae
- Genus: Stigmatomyces; H. Karst.

Type species
- Stigmatomyces muscae (Knoch) H. Karst.

Selected species
- Stigmatomyces australis; Stigmatomyces baeopteri; Stigmatomyces biformis; Stigmatomyces ceratophorus; Stigmatomyces crassicollis; Stigmatomyces entomophilus; Stigmatomyces ephydrae; Stigmatomyces hydreliae; Stigmatomyces ilytheae; Stigmatomyces limosinae; Stigmatomyces novozelandicus; Stigmatomyces purpureus; Stigmatomyces rugosus; Stigmatomyces spiralis

= Stigmatomyces =

Genus of fungi

Stigmatomyces is a genus of fungi in the family Laboulbeniaceae. The genus contains 135 species.
