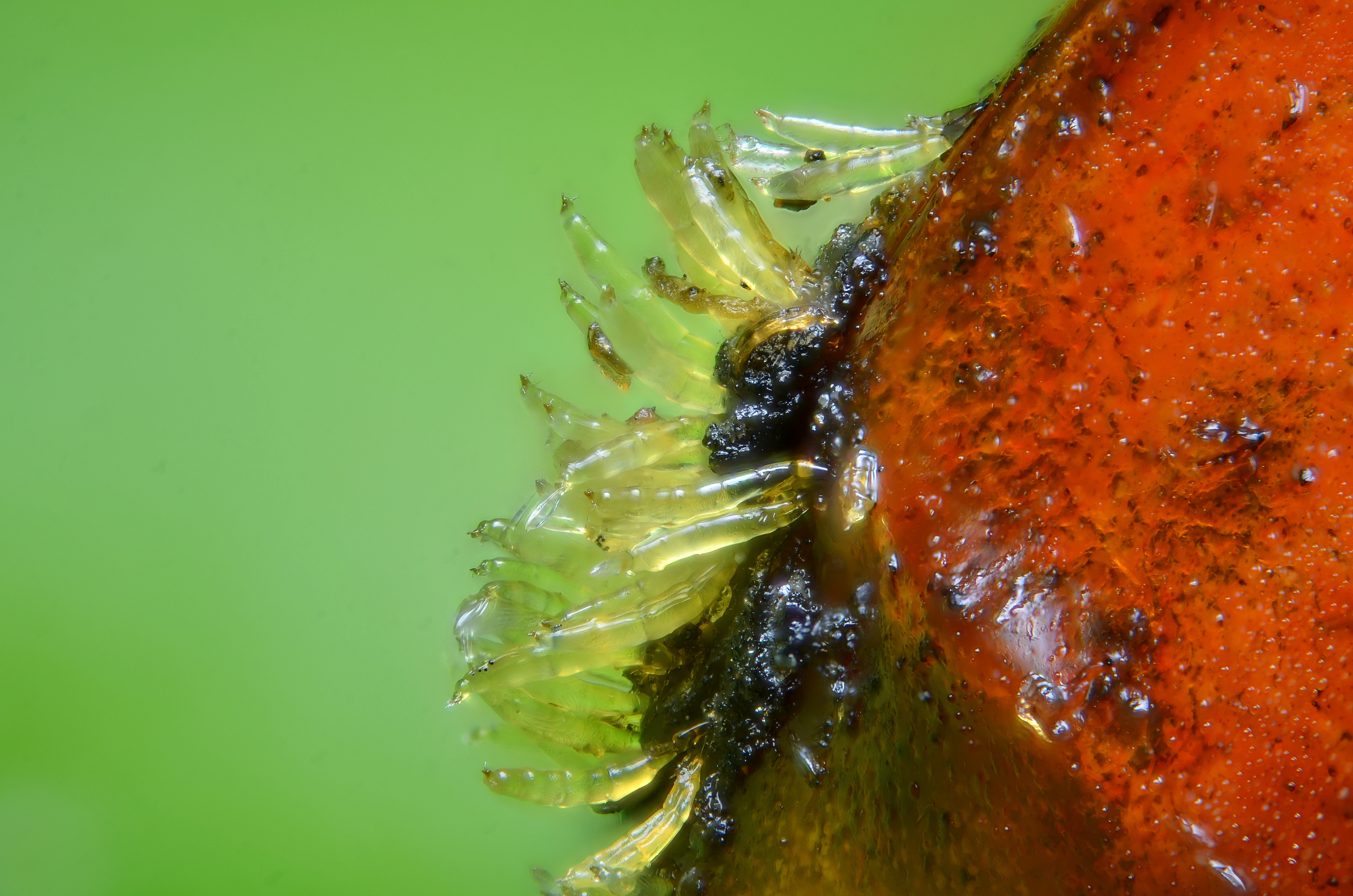
- Hesperomyces harmoniae on Harmonia axyridis

Scientific classification
- Kingdom: Fungi
- Division: Ascomycota
- Class: Laboulbeniomycetes
- Order: Laboulbeniales
- Family: Laboulbeniaceae
- Genus: Hesperomyces; Thaxt. (1891)

Type species
- Hesperomyces virescens Thaxt. (1891)

Species
- See text

= Hesperomyces =

Genus of fungi

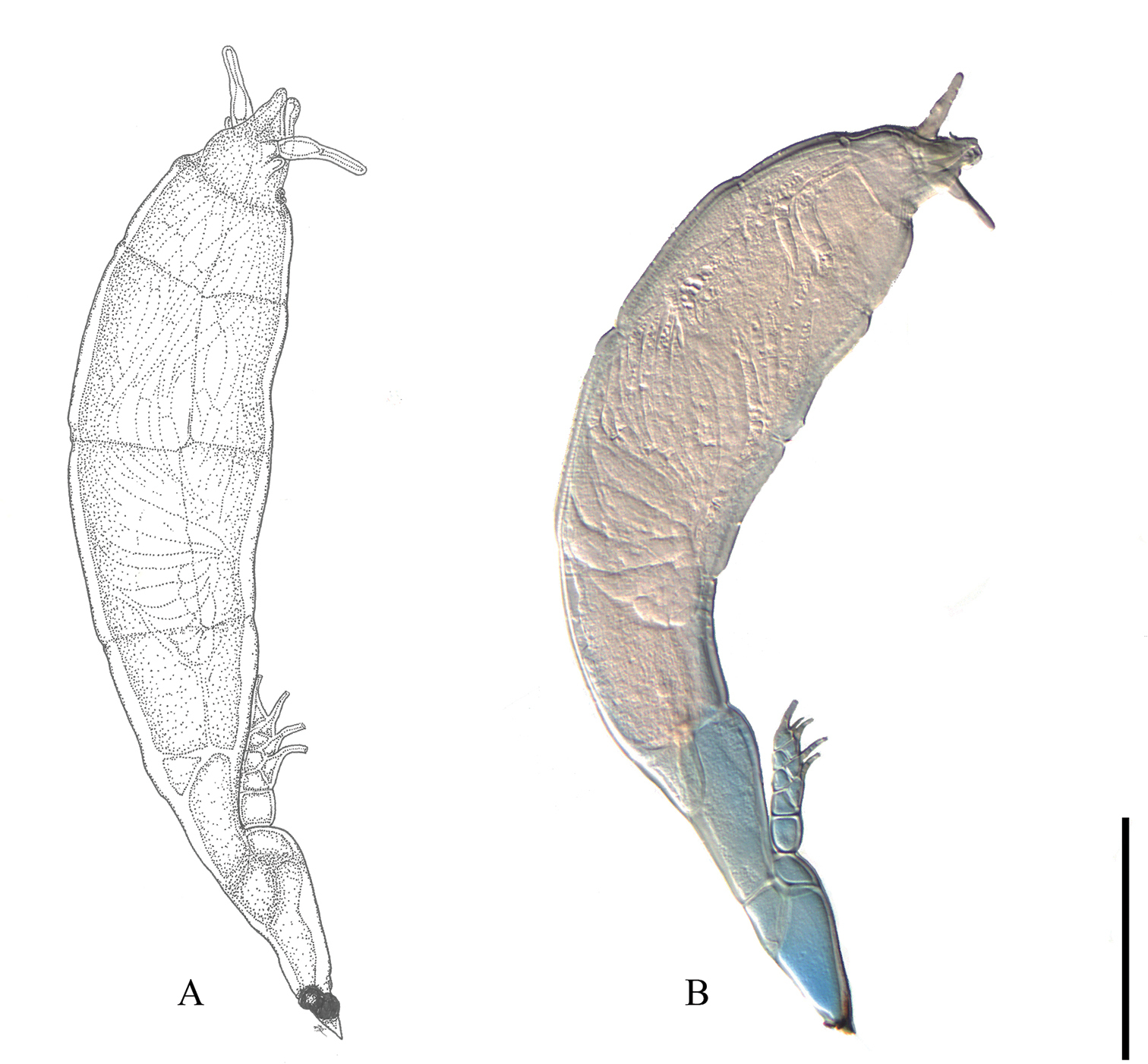
A mature thallus of the Hesperomyces halyziae.

Hesperomyces is a genus of fungi in the family Laboulbeniaceae. The genus contains at least fifteen species.

Most of them are ectoparasites of ladybugs (Coccinellidae), only He. biphylli is reported from Biphyllidae and He. catopii from Mycetophagidae, but their status as species within the genus needs confirmation.

The type species is the Green Beetle Hanger (Hesperomyces virescens). H. virescens (s.l.) is a complex of species. He. harmoniae, a member of this complex, is an ectoparasite of an invasive species to Europe and the Americas, the harlequin ladybird (Harmonia axyridis). Laboratory bioassays pointed out that He. virescens (s.l.)-infected ladybirds suffered increased mortality rates.

The fungus completes its entire life cycle on the tough outer layer or integument of a living host where individual fruiting bodies or thalli are formed directly from ascospores. The thalli can form on any part of the insect, but spore germination likely only occurs once the host cuticle has hardened. The spores are believed to have a short life span. Due to the spores' sticky nature, they are not transmitted by contact with substrate or the air. Instead they are spread directly by host activities and it is suggested that transmission occurs during feeding and mating season when sexual contact occurs, therefore making H. virescens (s.l.) a sexually transmitted disease of insects.

== Species ==
- Hesperomyces virescens species complex or He. virescens sensu lato (s.l.):
  - Hesperomyces chilocori-bipustulati Van Caenegem & Haelew. (2025)
  - Hesperomyces coccinellae-transversalis Van Caenegem & Haelew. (2025)
  - Hesperomyces halyziae Haelew. & De Kesel (2020)
  - Hesperomyces harmoniae Haelew. (2022)
  - Hesperomyces parexochomi Mironova & Haelew. (2021)
  - Hesperomyces virescens Thaxt. (1891) (He. virescens s.s.)
- Other species:
  - Hesperomyces auriculatus W.Rossi & M.Leonardi (2018)
  - Hesperomyces biphylli K.Sugiy. & T.Majewski (1985)
  - Hesperomyces catopii Thaxt. (1931)
  - Hesperomyces chilomenis (Thaxt.) Thaxt. (1931)
  - Hesperomyces coccinelloides (Thaxt.) Thaxt. (1931)
  - Hesperomyces coleomegillae W.Rossi & A.Weir (2014)
  - Hesperomyces hyperaspidis Thaxt. (1931)
  - Hesperomyces palustris W.Rossi & A.Weir (2014)
  - Hesperomyces papuanus T.Majewski & K.Sugiy. (1985)

He. coccinelloides may be a species complex.
