= Majewskia =

Scientific classification
- Kingdom: Fungi
- Division: Ascomycota
- Class: Laboulbeniomycetes
- Order: Laboulbeniales
- Family: Laboulbeniaceae
- Genus: Majewskia; Y.-B. Lee & Sugiyama

Type species
- Majewskia japonica Y.B. Lee & K. Sugiy.

Genus of fungi

Majewskia is a genus of fungi in the family Laboulbeniaceae. A monotypic genus, it contains the single species Majewskia japonica.
