= Peyritschia =

Scientific classification
- Kingdom: Plantae
- Clade: Tracheophytes
- Clade: Angiosperms
- Clade: Monocots
- Clade: Commelinids
- Order: Poales
- Family: Poaceae
- Subfamily: Pooideae
- Supertribe: Poodae
- Tribe: Poeae
- Subtribe: Aveninae
- Genus: Peyritschia; E.Fourn.

Type species
- Peyritschia koelerioides (Peyr.) E.Fourn.

Genus of grasses

Peyritschia is a genus of Latin American plants in the grass family.

== Species ==
31 species are accepted.

- Peyritschia angusta (Swallen) P.M.Peterson, Soreng, Romasch. & Barberá – Guatemala and southeastern Mexico
- Peyritschia bealii P.M.Peterson, Soreng, Romasch. & Barberá – eastern and southwestern Mexico
- Peyritschia coahuilensis (P.M.Peterson, Soreng & Valdés-Reyna) P.M.Peterson, Soreng, Romasch. & Barberá – northeastern Mexico
- Peyritschia conferta (Pilg.) Finot – Venezuela and Ecuador
- Peyritschia curviseta (Morden & Valdés-Reyna) P.M.Peterson, Soreng, Romasch. & Barberá – northeastern Mexico (Nuevo León)
- Peyritschia deyeuxioides (Kunth) Finot – Mexico, Central America, Colombia, Venezuela, Ecuador, and Peru
- Peyritschia durangensis (Finot & P.M.Peterson) P.M.Peterson, Soreng, Romasch. & Barberá – northern Mexico (Durango)
- Peyritschia erectifolia (Hitchc.) P.M.Peterson, Soreng, Romasch. & Barberá – central and southwestern Mexico
- Peyritschia eriantha (Kunth) P.M.Peterson, Soreng, Romasch. & Barberá – central Mexico
- Peyritschia filifolia (Scribn. ex Beal) P.M.Peterson, Soreng, Romasch. & Barberá – northeastern Mexico
- Peyritschia foliosa (Swallen) P.M.Peterson, Soreng, Romasch. & Barberá – northwestern Mexico
- Peyritschia graphephoroides P.M.Peterson, Soreng, Romasch. & Barberá – Guatemala and southern Mexico, Costa Rica and Panama
- Peyritschia howellii (Hitchc.) Finot & P.M.Peterson – Galápagos
- Peyritschia humilis (Louis-Marie) Finot – central Mexico
- Peyritschia irazuensis (Kuntze) P.M.Peterson, Soreng, Romasch. & Barberá – Mexico, Central America, Colombia, Venezuela, and Ecuador
- Peyritschia killipii (Swallen) P.M.Peterson, Soreng, Romasch. & Barberá – Colombia
- Peyritschia koelerioides (Peyr.) E.Fourn. - Mexico and Guatemala
- Peyritschia martha-gonzaleziae (P.M.Peterson & Finot) P.M.Peterson, Soreng, Romasch. & Barberá – northern Mexico (Chihuahua and Durango)
- Peyritschia orizabae (Rupr. ex E.Fourn.) P.M.Peterson, Soreng, Romasch. & Barberá – south-central Mexico (Veracruz to Oaxaca)
- Peyritschia palmeri (Hitchc.) P.M.Peterson, Soreng, Romasch. & Barberá – northern and western Mexico
- Peyritschia pinetorum (Swallen) Finot & P.M.Peterson – southeastern Mexico and Guatemala
- Peyritschia planifolia (Kunth) P.M.Peterson, Soreng, Romasch. & Barberá – Costa Rica and western South America from Venezuela to Bolivia
- Peyritschia pringlei (Scribn.) S.D.Koch – Mexico, Guatemala, Costa Rica, Venezuela, Ecuador, and Peru
- Peyritschia spellenbergii (Soreng, Finot & P.M.Peterson) P.M.Peterson, Soreng, Romasch. & Barberá – northern Mexico (Sonora and Chihuahua)
- Peyritschia tolucensis (Kunth) P.M.Peterson, Soreng, Romasch. & Barberá – Guatemala and central and southern Mexico
- Peyritschia tonduzii (Hitchc.) P.M.Peterson, Soreng, Romasch. & Barberá – Costa Rica and Panama
- Peyritschia valida (Sohns) P.M.Peterson, Soreng, Romasch. & Barberá – western Mexico
- Peyritschia viridis (Kunth) P.M.Peterson, Soreng, Romasch. & Barberá – Guatemala and northeastern, central, and southwestern Mexico
- Peyritschia virletii (E.Fourn.) P.M.Peterson, Soreng, Romasch. & Barberá – Mexico
- Peyritschia vulcanica (Swallen) P.M.Peterson, Soreng, Romasch. & Barberá – Guatemala and southeastern Mexico
