= Euceratomycetaceae =

Scientific classification
- Kingdom: Fungi
- Division: Ascomycota
- Class: Laboulbeniomycetes
- Order: Laboulbeniales
- Family: Euceratomycetaceae; I.I. Tav. (1980)

Genera
- Cochliomyces; Colonomyces; Euceratomyces; Euzodiomyces; Pseudoecteinomyces

Family of fungi

Euceratomycetaceae is a family of fungi in the order Laboulbeniales. These fungi, found mostly in temperate zones, tend to be parasitic or epibiotic on insect exoskeletons.
