= Phytophthora phaseoli =

Scientific classification
- Domain: Eukaryota
- Clade: Sar
- Clade: Stramenopiles
- Phylum: Oomycota
- Class: Peronosporomycetes
- Order: Peronosporales
- Family: Peronosporaceae
- Genus: Phytophthora
- Species: P. phaseoli

Binomial name
- Phytophthora phaseoli Thaxter

Species of single-celled organism

Phytophthora phaseoli is a plant pathogen which infects lima bean (Phaseolus lunatus) and has no other known hosts.
