= François Picard (naturalist) =

French naturalist

François Picard (1879, Dijon (Côte-d'Or) - 1939, Paris) was a French naturalist who specialised in botany and entomology. He wrote Faune de France Volume n° 20 (1879-1939) Coléoptères Cérambycidae 1929, 168 p. He was a Member of the Société Entomologique de France.

The standard author abbreviation F.Picard is used to indicate this person as the author when citing a botanical name.
