= Roland Thaxter =

American mycologist (1858–1932)

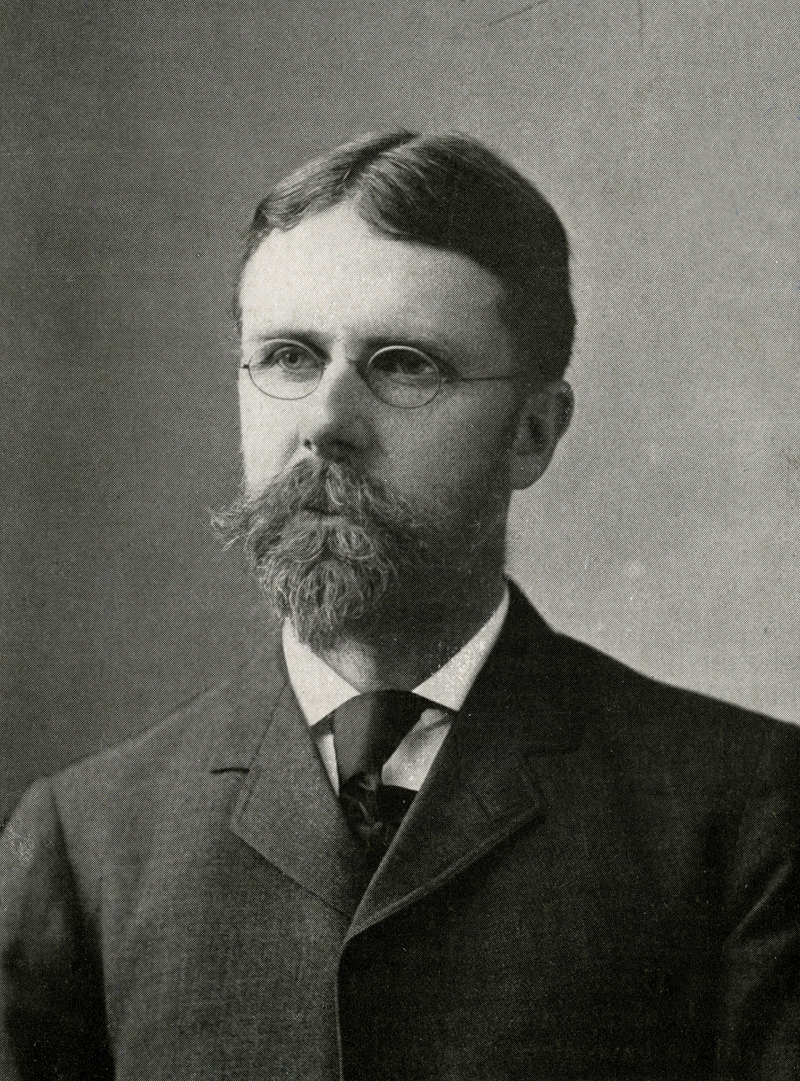
- Born: August 28, 1858
- Died: April 22, 1932 (aged 73)
- Scientific career
- Author abbrev. (botany): Thaxt.

Roland Thaxter (August 28, 1858 – April 22, 1932) was an American mycologist, plant pathologist, botanist, and entomologist, renowned for his contribution to the insect parasitic fungi—Laboulbeniales. He was educated at Harvard University, where he dedicated forty years to mycological and botanical research. His five-volume series on fungi in the order Laboulbeniales laid a solid foundation of research on these insect ectoparasites. He also contributed to the field of plant pathology.

== Biography ==
Roland Thaxter was born in Newtonville, Massachusetts, 1858, the third and youngest child in the family. His parents were Levi Thaxter and Celia (née Laighton) Thaxter. He married Mabel Gray Thaxter in 1887. Thaxter's personality was influenced greatly by his literary family. His father was a lawyer and an authority who brought the works of the poet Robert Browning to the American public. His mother, Celia Thaxter, was a distinguished poet, most well known for her book An Island Garden. In addition to this literary background, Roland was inspired by nature in his youth, fostering in him an unusual aesthetic sensibility that he brought to his scientific works.

== Education and research career ==
Roland Thaxter entered Harvard in 1878 and completed an A.B. degree in 1882. In 1883, he attended the Harvard Medical School for doctoral study in medicine. One year later, a two-year Harris Fellowship led him to leave the medical school and join the Graduate School of Art and Science, a turning point in Thaxter's career. He conducted studies of cryptogamic botany under William Gilson Farlow. Farlow was an important mentor to Thaxter in both his scientific work and his private life.

He pursued a doctoral degree and served as a research assistant under Farlow from 1886 to 1888. During this period, Thaxter published an important Gymnosporangium paper, “On Certain Cultures of Gymnosporangium with Notes on their Roesteliae”, in which he described relationships between Gymnosporangium and Roestelia species. In 1888, Thaxter received the degrees of M.A. and Ph.D., with his thesis monographing “The Entomophthoreae of the United States”. From 1888 to 1891, he took a position as the first plant pathologist at the Connecticut Agricultural Experiment Station. He set up a third department in the Station and named it “Mycology”. During his brief time at the Station, his research led to valuable discoveries in Phytopathology. He described the pathogen of potato scab, Oospora scabies, the mildew of lima beans (Phytophthora phaseoli), the onion smut (Urocystis cepulae), and pioneered the use of fungicide sprays to control fungal diseases.

In 1891, Thaxter accepted the call and returned to Harvard, where he combined his interest in Entomology and Mycology to work on insect parasitic fungi in the order Laboulbeniales. His research was published from 1896 to 1931 in five volumes that included 103 genera, approximately 1200 species, and 13 varieties. The five volumes included over 3000 meticulous and elegant pen-and-ink illustrations arranged in 166 plates.

In 1901, Thaxter was promoted to the position of Full Professor of Cryptogamic Botany. After the death of Farlow in 1919, Thaxter retired and became Professor Emeritus and Honorary Curator of the Farlow Herbarium, where he focused on his own research.

== Other scientific contributions ==
In addition to his intensive studies on Laboulbeniales, Thaxter's research covered topics in Entomology, Botany, Bacteriology, and other groups of fungi. Entomology was his early interest on which he published his first six research papers. His doctoral thesis, “Monograph of Entomophthoraceae”, was the first American study of these insect parasitic fungi. He described Myxobacteria in 1892, based on their peculiar life stages and structural developments. In 1922, Thaxter published “A revision of the Endogonaceae”, the first monograph of that family in which the morphology and development of Endogone, Glaziella, Sclerocystis, and Sphaerocreas were described and illustrated in detail. He issued the exsiccata series Reliquiae Farlowianae (1922).

== Anecdotes ==
Thaxter was nicknamed “squirt gun botanist”, likely a result of his introduction of fungicide spray methods to American agriculture. His interests in science were “pure” rather than “practical,” as revealed in a letter he wrote to Dr. Farlow during his work at the Connecticut Agricultural Experiment Station: "looking back at my year's work with a sickish feeling when I balance my practical accomplishment with my cash recompense." Thaxter traveled extensively and made several collecting tours in the Americas and in Europe. His most extensive expedition was during his sabbatical year in 1905–1906, when sailed from Liverpool, New York to Buenos Aires, then traveled to the Falkland Islands and the Strait of Magellan to the southernmost tip of South America.

== Honors and rewards ==
His eminence in both botany and mycology led Thaxter to participate in many American and European scientific societies. He served as president of the New England Botanical Club, the American Mycological Society, and the Botanical Society of America. He was a member of Phi Beta Kappa, the Botanical Society of America, the American Phytopathological Society, the Boston Society of Natural History, the American Philosophical Society, and the National Academy of Sciences. In addition, he was a Fellow of the American Association for the Advancement of Science and of the American Academy of Arts and Sciences. Outside the United States, Thaxter was a foreign member of the Russian Mycological Society, the Linnaean Societies of London and Lyons, the Royal Botanical Society of Belgium, the Royal Academies of Sweden and Denmark, the Botanical Society of Edinburgh, the Academy of Science of the Institute of France, the British Mycological Society, and the Deutsche Botanische Gesellschaft. In recognition of his contributions on the Laboulbeniales, the French Academy awarded him the Prix Desmazières.

== Eponyms of Roland Thaxter ==
=== Eponymous genera ===
- Thaxterogaster Singer
