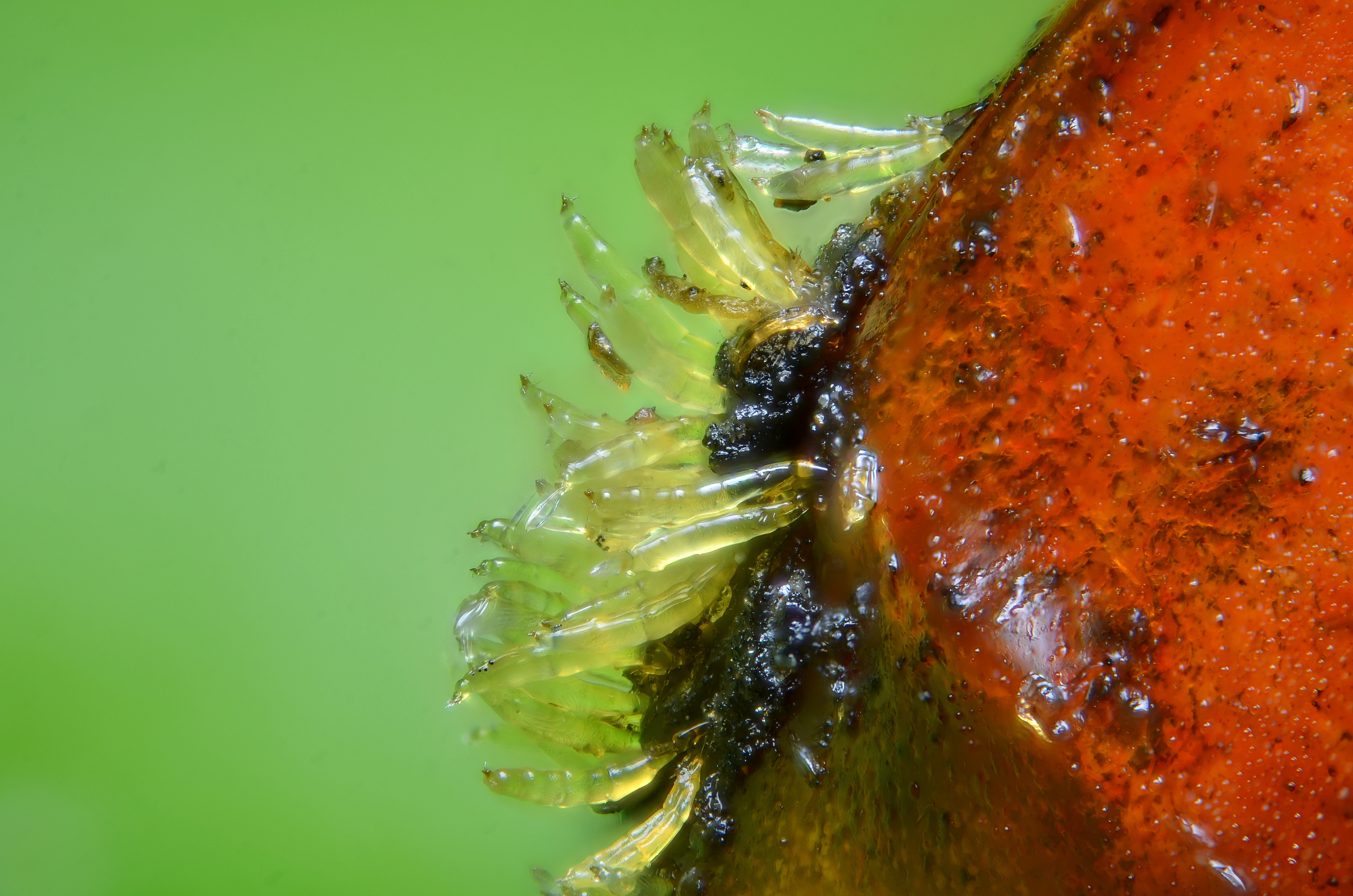
- Laboulbeniales on a ladybird, possibly Hesperomyces virescens

Scientific classification
- Kingdom: Fungi
- Division: Ascomycota
- Class: Laboulbeniomycetes
- Order: Laboulbeniales
- Family: Laboulbeniaceae; G. Winter (1886)

Genera
- Dimeromyces; Hesperomyces; Laboulbenia; Rickia; Stigmatomyces...

= Laboulbeniaceae =

Family of fungi

The Laboulbeniaceae are a family of fungi in the order Laboulbeniales. Taxa have a widespread distribution, and are parasitic to various orders of insects.

== See also ==
- List of Laboulbeniaceae genera
