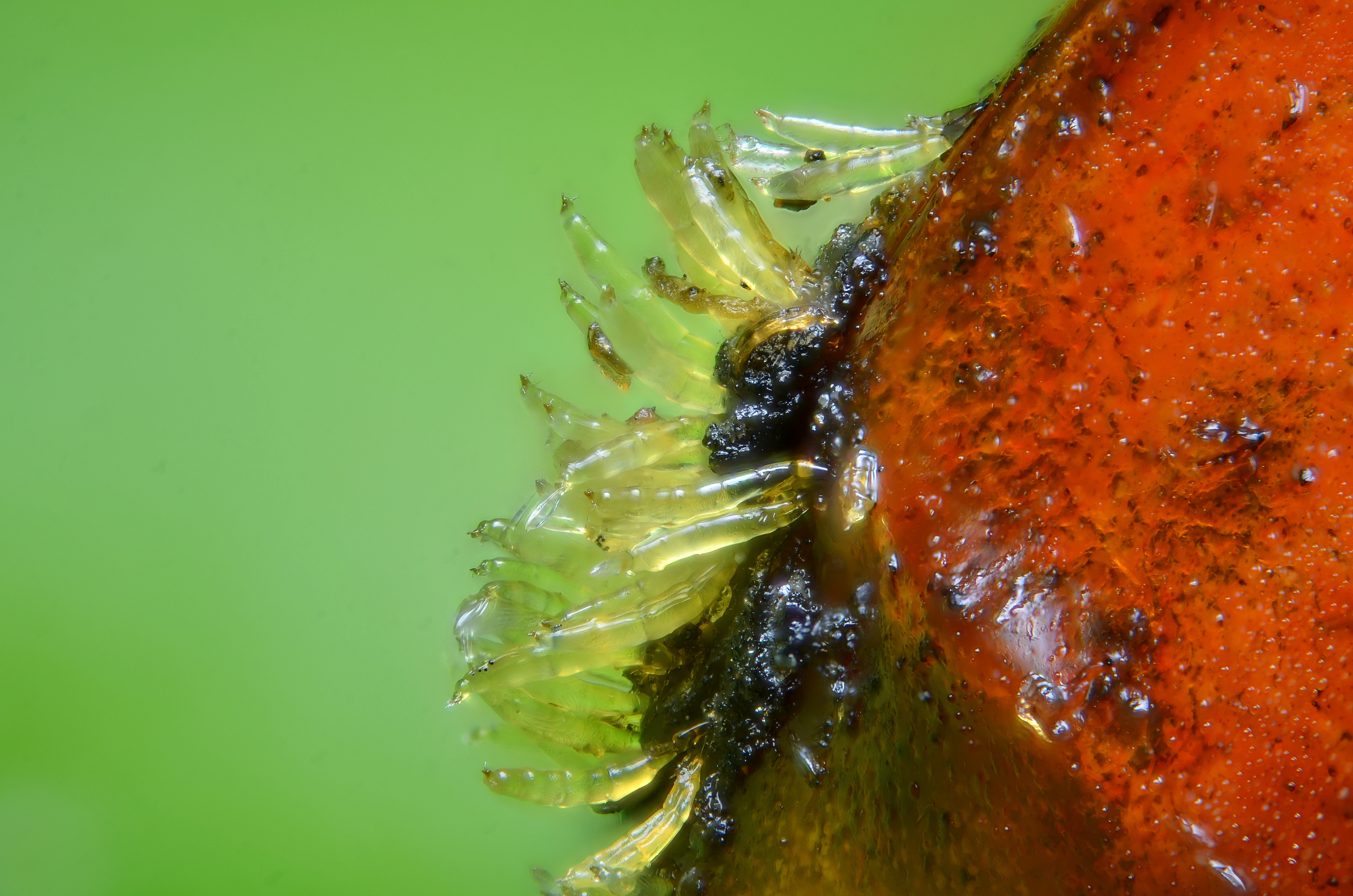
- Elytral tips of a Harmonia axyridis ladybird with thalli of Hesperomyces virescens (Laboulbeniales)

Scientific classification
- Domain: Eukaryota
- Kingdom: Fungi
- Division: Ascomycota
- (unranked): Sordariomyceta
- Class: Laboulbeniomycetes; Engler (1898)

Orders
- Herpomycetales; Laboulbeniales; Pyxidiophorales

= Laboulbeniomycetes =

Class of fungi

The Laboulbeniomycetes are a unique group of fungi that are obligatorily associated with arthropods, either as external parasites (Herpomycetales and Laboulbeniales) or for dispersal (Pyxidiophorales).

Herpomycetales and Laboulbeniales fungi are minute; their fruiting bodies, referred to as thalli, commonly measure less than one millimeter. They live on the antennae, the mouthparts or other body regions of their arthropod hosts. Although several species of Laboulbeniomycetes have more or less extensive, root-like hyphal systems (haustoria) inside their hosts, as a group these fungi are relatively harmless to their hosts. These fungi occur usually only on adult hosts; apparently immature arthropods eliminate them during ecdysis (adult arthropods no longer molt). Some thallus-forming species are dioecious, that is, they have separate female and male individuals, like Herpomyces (in the order Herpomycetales).
