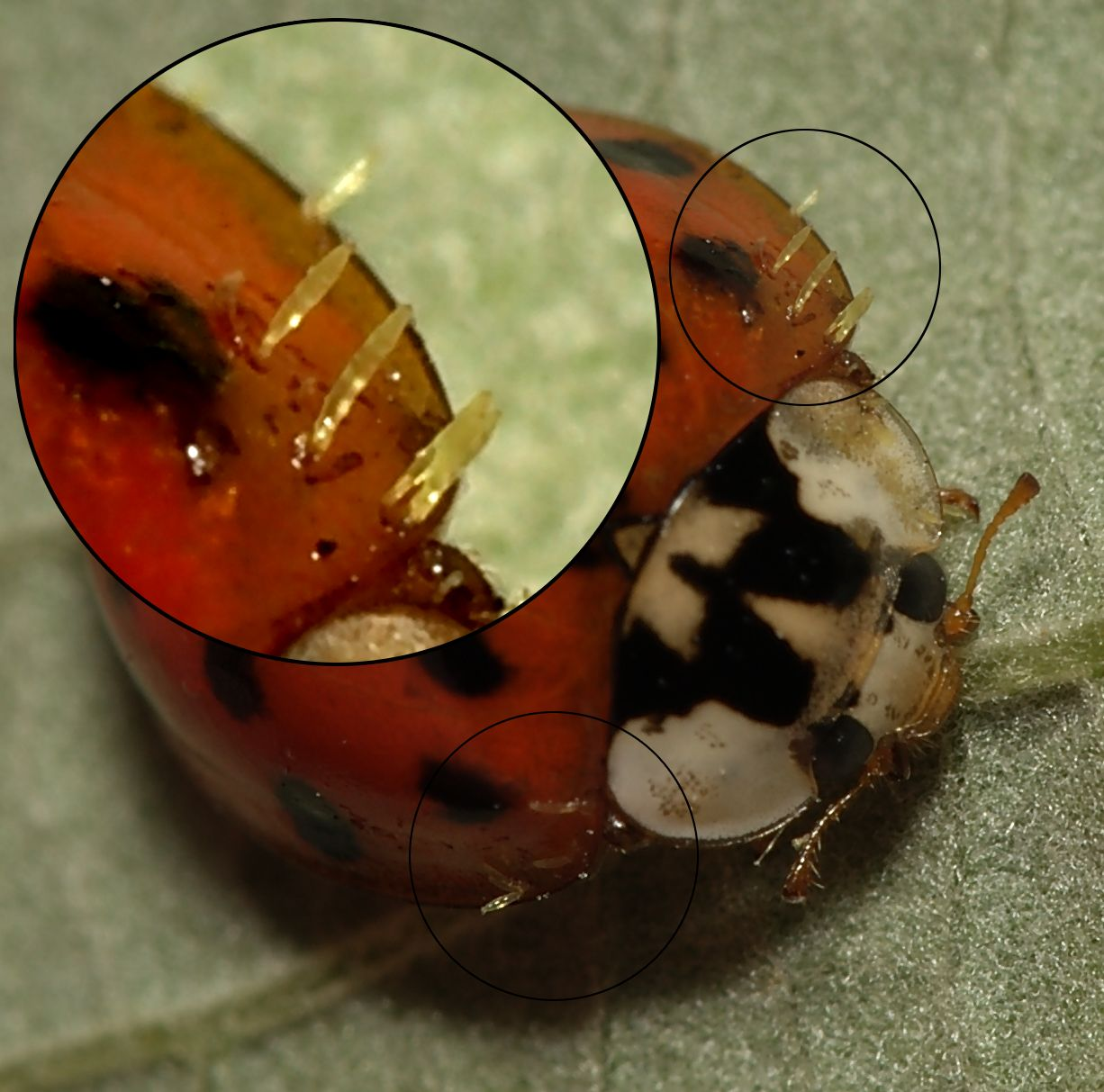
- Hesperomyces virescens on Harmonia axyridis

Scientific classification
- Kingdom: Fungi
- Division: Ascomycota
- Class: Laboulbeniomycetes
- Order: Laboulbeniales; Engler (1898)

Families
- Ceratomycetaceae; Euceratomycetaceae; Laboulbeniaceae

= Laboulbeniales =

Order of fungi

The Laboulbeniales is an order of fungi within the class Laboulbeniomycetes. They are also known by the colloquial name beetle hangers or labouls. The order includes around 2,325 species of obligate insect ectoparasites that produce cellular thalli from two-celled ascospores. Of the described Laboulbeniales, Weir and Hammond 1997 find 80% to be from Coleoptera and the next largest group to be the 10% from Diptera. Recently, the genus Herpomyces, traditionally considered a basal member of Laboulbeniales, was transferred to the order Herpomycetales based on molecular phylogenetic data. Laboulbeniales typically do not kill their hosts, although they may impair host fitness if the parasite density is high.

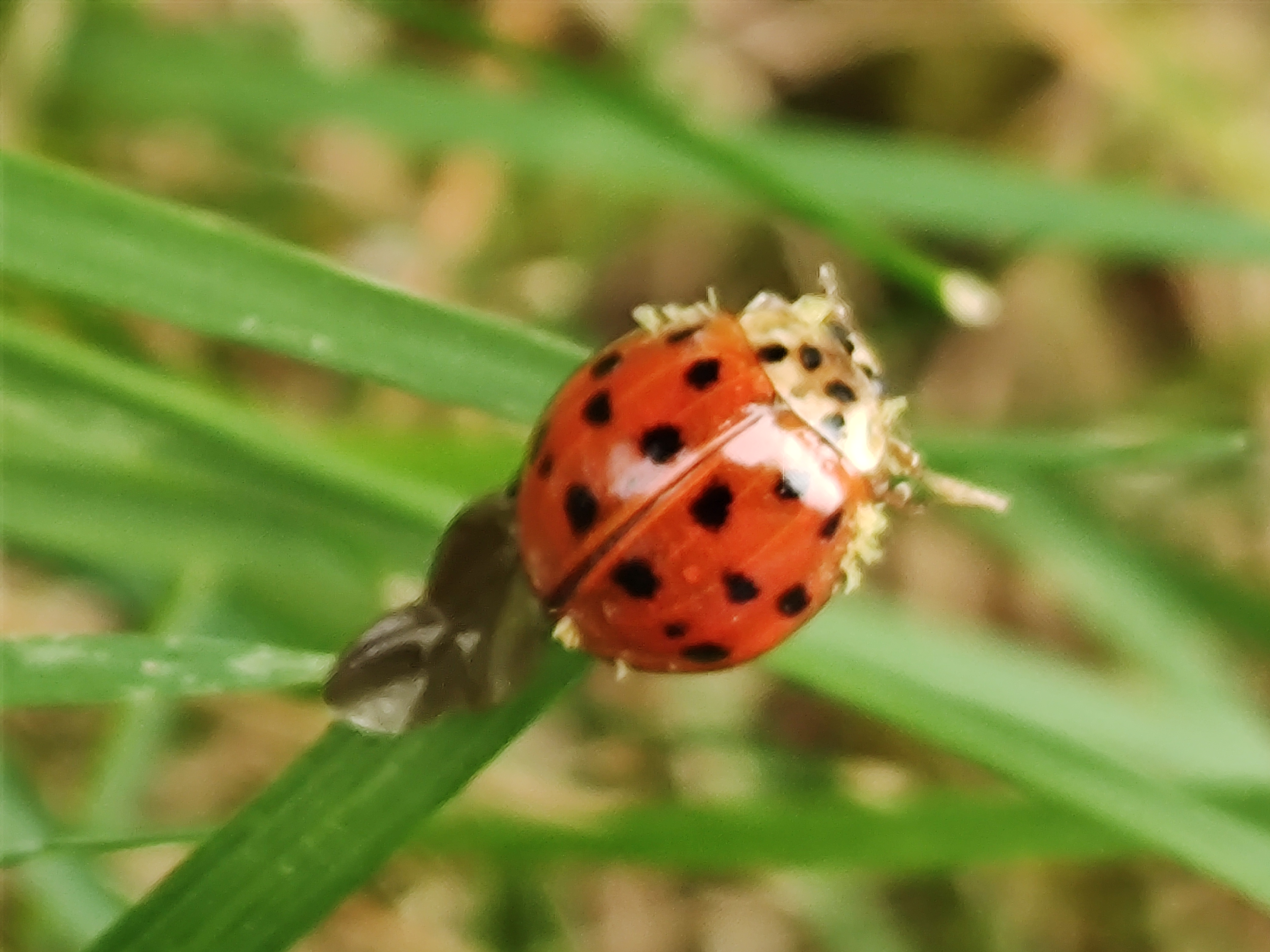
A ladybug with Laboulbeniomycetes

Laboulbeniales form individual thalli, and lack vegetative hyphae. A thallus is attached to its host by a simple dark-colored foot cell, or a rhizoidal haustorium through which the fungus penetrates the exoskeleton of its host to draw nutrients from the hemolymph. The external part of the thallus may form male structures (antheridia) or female structures (trichogynes and perithecia), or both. New infections are initiated when spores from the perithecia attach to a compatible insect host. Spore transmission can sometimes occur during insect copulation, which may account for the different site specificity sometimes observed in male and female hosts. These fungi do not grow apart from their hosts.

Foundational work on the Laboulbeniales was completed by the American mycologist Roland Thaxter (1858–1932), particularly in his five-volume, illustrated Monograph of the Laboulbeniaceae (Thaxter 1896, 1908, 1924, 1926, 1931).

Recent molecular phylogenetic work has shown that some taxa are complexes of multiple species segregated by host, for example Hesperomyces virescens. The classification of the order Laboulbeniales follows Isabelle Tavares (1985) but several taxa in that system are polyphyletic.
