= H. gracilis =

H. gracilis may refer to:

- Haopterus gracilis, an extinct pterosaur species from the Barremian-Aptian-age Lower Cretaceous Yixian Formation of Liaoning, China
- Harttia gracilis, a catfish species
- Hemaris gracilis, the hummingbird moth or slender clearwing
- Hemidactylus gracilis, the graceful leaf-toed gecko, a gecko species found in India
- Hemigrammus gracilis, a tetra species found in Brazil
- Herpomyces gracilis, a fungus in genus Herpomyces
- Heterophasia gracilis, the grey sibia, a bird species found in China, India and Myanmar
- Hetschkia gracilis, a spider species found in Brazil
- Homalia gracilis, James in Peck, a moss species in the genus Homalia
- Horsfieldia gracilis, a plant species found in Brunei and Malaysia
- Hydrangea gracilis, a flowering plant species native to China
- Hymenocephalus gracilis, the graceful grenadier, a rattail species

== Synonyms ==
- Hesperilla gracilis, a synonym for Anisynta cynone, a butterfly species found in New South Wales, Victoria and South Australia
- Hylodes gracilis, a synonym for Batrachyla leptopus, a frog species found in Argentina and Chile

== See also ==
- Gracilis (disambiguation)
