= C. gracilis =

C. gracilis may refer to:

- Caecilia gracilis, an amphibian species
- Callitris gracilis, a conifer species found only in Australia
- Campylobacter gracilis, a species of Campylobacter bacteria
- Cancer gracilis, the graceful rock crab or slender crab, a crab species
- Capsella gracilis, a species of flowering plant
- Cardioglossa gracilis, a frog species
- Catocala gracilis, the graceful underwing, a moth species
- Chapmannia gracilis, a legume species found only in Yemen
- Charassognathus gracilis, an extinct cynodontia species
- Citrus gracilis, the Humpty Doo lime or Kakadu lime, a straggly shrub species found in the Northern Territory, Australia
- Clarkia gracilis, the slender clarkia, a wildflower species native to California
- Coccothrinax gracilis, the latanier, a palm species endemic to the island of Hispaniola
- Coelus gracilis, a beetle species endemic to the United States
- Coelurus gracilis, a coelurosaur dinosaur species
- Coluber gracilis, the graceful racer, a snake species found in India
- Conchoraptor gracilis, an oviraptorid dinosaur species
- Coniogramme gracilis, a fern species
- Coursetia gracilis, a legume species found only in Ecuador
- Cordicephalus gracilis, an extinct prehistoric frog species
- Crania gracilis, a brachiopod species in the genus Crania
- Cricosaurus gracilis, an extinct marine crocodyliform species
- Crocodilichthys gracilis, the lizard triplefin, a fish species
- Cryptotis gracilis, the Talamancan small-eared shrew, a mammal species
- Cynosurus gracilis, a grass species in the genus Cynosurus

== See also ==
- Gracilis (disambiguation)
