= P. gracilis =

P. gracilis may refer to:

- Pachyaena gracilis, an extinct mammal species in the genus Pachyaena
- Palaeospheniscus gracilis, an extinct penguin species
- Pandercetes gracilis, the lichen huntsman spider, a spider species found in Australia
- Panulirus gracilis, a lobster species in the genus Panulirus
- Paradoxides gracilis, a trilobite species
- Paraprotopteryx gracilis, an extinct enantiornithine bird species of the Early Cretaceous
- Pearcea gracilis, a plant species endemic to Ecuador
- Penstemon gracilis, the slender beardtongue, a wild flower species of the genus Penstemon found in Minnesota
- Petaurus gracilis, the mahogany glider, an endangered possum species
- Phlox gracilis, the slender phlox, a plant species
- Physalaemus gracilis, a frog species
- Plasmodium gracilis, a parasite species
- Plectomyces gracilis, a fungus species
- Pleurothallis gracilis, an orchid species endemic to Brazil
- Polygonia gracilis, the hoary comma, a butterfly species common in boreal North America
- Polyscias gracilis, a plant species endemic to Mauritius
- Potentilla gracilis, the slender cinquefoil or graceful cinquefoil, a plant species
- Pouteria gracilis, a plant species endemic to Peru
- Pradhania gracilis, a dinosaur species from the Early Jurassic
- Prinia gracilis, the graceful prinia, a small warbler species
- Protodiplatys gracilis, an extinct earwig species
- Pseudomyrmex gracilis, the elongate twig ant, an ant species
- Pugettia gracilis, the graceful kelp crab, a crab species

== Synonyms ==
- Palene gracilis, a synonym for Thallarcha sparsana, a moth found in Victoria, New South Wales and Queensland

== See also ==
- Gracilis (disambiguation)
