= E. gracilis =

E. gracilis may refer to:

- Eisenia gracilis, a kelp species in the genus Eisenia
- Eleginus gracilis, the saffron cod, a commercially harvested fish closely related to true cod
- Eleutherodactylus gracilis, a species of frog in the family Leptodactylidae endemic to Colombia
- Encheliophis gracilis, a pearlfish species in the genus Encheliophis
- Eucalyptus gracilis, a tree native to Australia
- Eudiaptomus gracilis, a crustacean of the genus Eudiaptomus
- Euglena gracilis, a unicellular protist species
- Eulophia gracilis, an orchid species occurring from Western Tropical Africa to Angola

== Synonyms ==
- Epeira gracilis, a synonym for Argiope argentata, a spider species

== See also ==
- Gracilis (disambiguation)
