= F. gracilis =

F. gracilis may refer to:

- Farlowella gracilis, a catfish species
- Ferocactus gracilis, a cactus species
- Ficus gracilis, a sea snail species
- Fluviopupa gracilis, a gastropod species endemic to Australia
- Froelichia gracilis, a plant species in the genus Froelichia

== See also ==
- Gracilis (disambiguation)
