= Ficus variegata =

Ficus variegata may refer to:

- Ficus variegata (plant), a species of tropical fig tree
- Ficus variegata (gastropod), a species of sea snail
