= Pandercetes celebensis vulcanicola =

Scientific classification
- Kingdom: Animalia
- Phylum: Arthropoda
- Subphylum: Chelicerata
- Class: Arachnida
- Order: Araneae
- Infraorder: Araneomorphae
- Family: Sparassidae
- Genus: Pandercetes
- Species: P. celebensis
- Subspecies: P. c. vulcanicola

Trinomial name
- Pandercetes celebensis vulcanicola Merian, 1911

Subspecies of spider from Indonesia

Pandercetes celebensis vulcanicola is a subspecies of huntsman spider in the family Sparassidae. It was described by C. Merian in 1911 from Indonesia.

The taxon belongs to the genus Pandercetes, a group of cryptically camouflaged huntsman spiders known for their resemblance to mosses and lichens on tree bark and forest surfaces.

== Taxonomy ==
Pandercetes celebensis vulcanicola was described by C. Merian in 1911 as a subspecific taxon within Pandercetes celebensis.

== Distribution ==
The subspecies is known from Indonesia.
