= J. gracilis =

J. gracilis may refer to:

- Jaegeria gracilis, a flowering plant species
- Jungia gracilis, a plant species of the genus Jungia
- Juniperus gracilis, a plant species in the genus Juniperus

== See also ==
- Gracilis (disambiguation)
