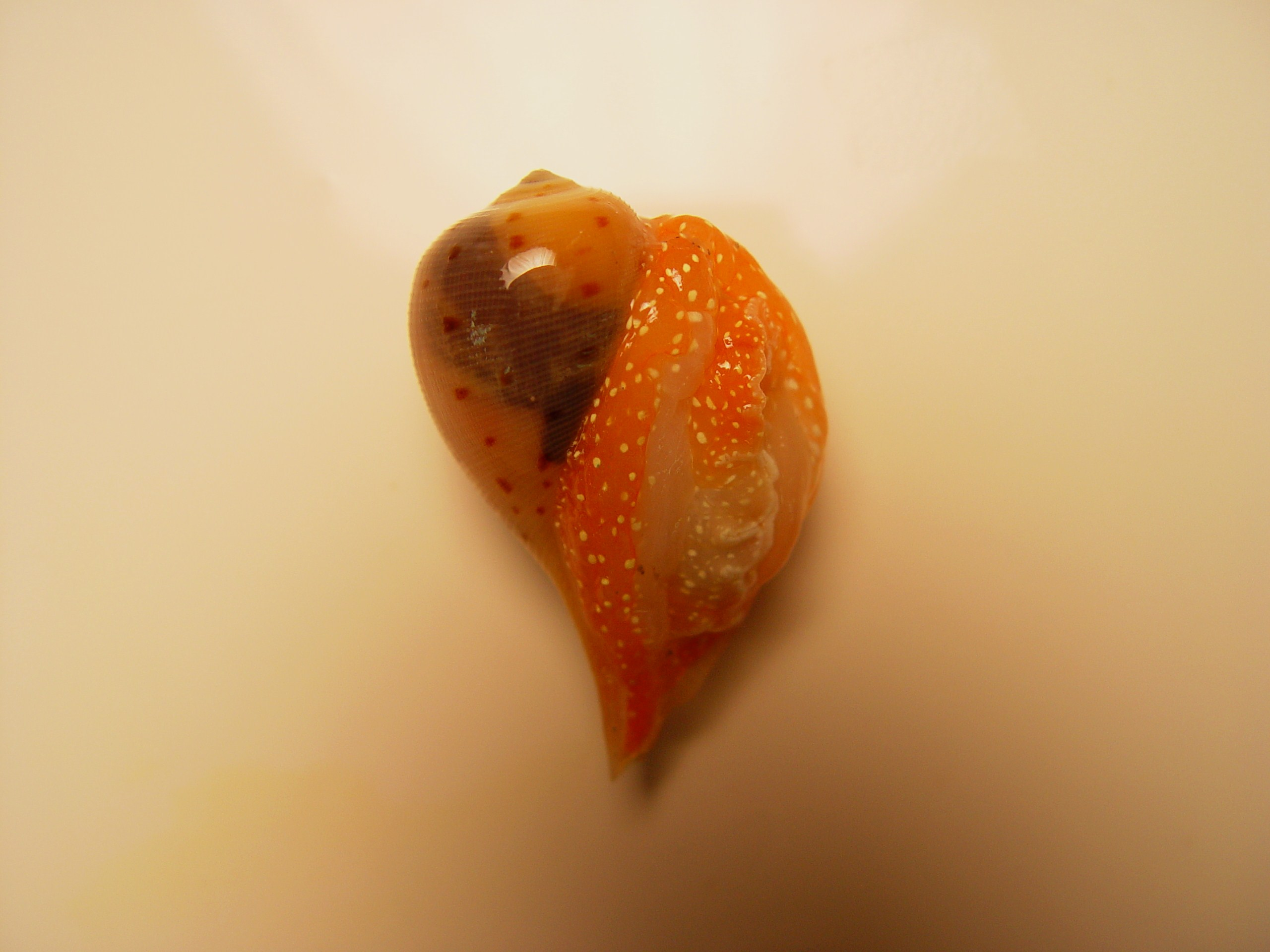

Scientific classification
- Kingdom: Animalia
- Phylum: Mollusca
- Class: Gastropoda
- Subclass: Caenogastropoda
- Order: Littorinimorpha
- Family: Ficidae
- Genus: Ficus
- Species: F. pellucida

Binomial name
- Ficus pellucida Deshayes, 1856

Synonyms
- Ficus atlanticus Clench & Aguayo, 1940; Ficus howelli Clench & Aguayo, 1940; Ficus pellucidus Deshayes, 1856 (Incorrect gender ending)

= Ficus pellucida =

Species of gastropod

Ficus pellucida, common name the Atlantic fig shell, is a species of sea snail, a marine gastropod mollusk in the family Ficidae, the fig shells.

== Distribution ==
This species is distributed in the Caribbean Sea (along Cuba and Hispaniola), the Lesser Antilles and in the Atlantic Ocean from Venezuela to East Brazil.

== Description ==
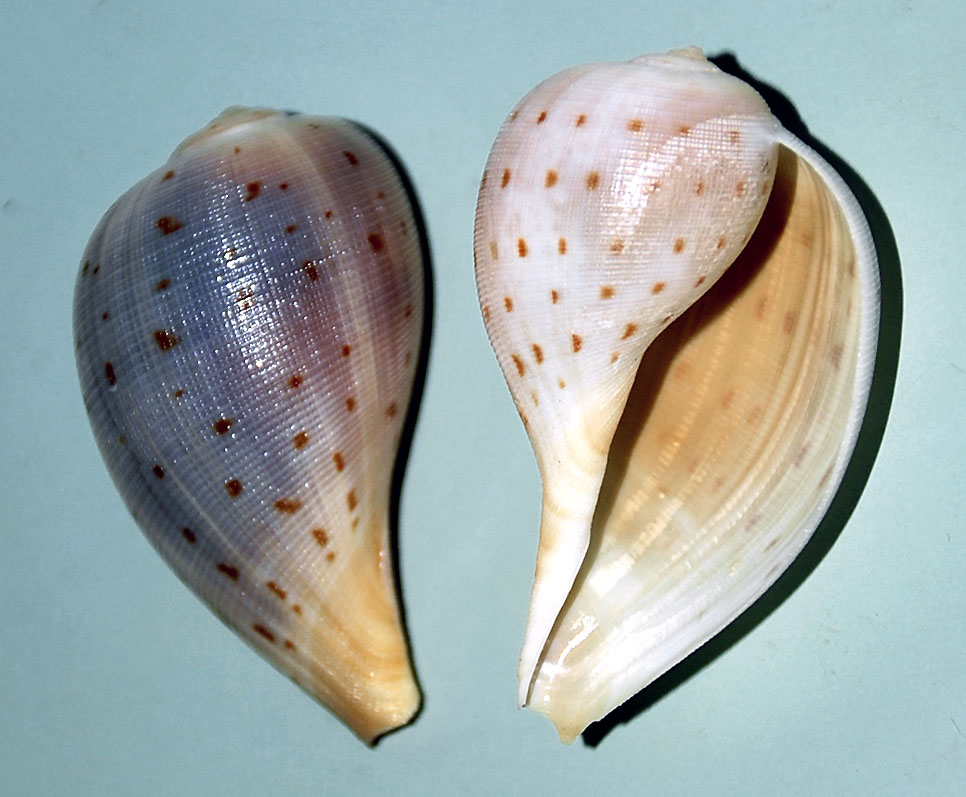
The maximum recorded shell length is 70 mm. Exoskeletons of Ficus pellucida

== Habitat ==
The minimum recorded depth for this species is 73 m; maximum recorded depth is 823 m.
