= Ficus filosa =

Scientific classification
- Kingdom: Animalia
- Phylum: Mollusca
- Class: Gastropoda
- Subclass: Caenogastropoda
- Order: Littorinimorpha
- Family: Ficidae
- Genus: Ficus
- Species: F. filosa

Binomial name
- Ficus filosa (Sowerby III, 1892)

Synonyms
- Pyrula filosa Sowerby, G. B. (III), 1892; Pyrula reticulata Lamarck, 1822; Ficus filosus (G. B. Sowerby III, 1892)

Species of gastropod

Ficus filosus, common name: the threaded fig shell, is a species of sea snail, a marine gastropod mollusk in the family Ficidae, the fig shells.

== Description ==
The shell size varies between 47 mm and 120 mm.

== Distribution ==
This species is distributed in the Pacific Ocean along Japan and Australia.
