= Ficus eospila =

Scientific classification
- Kingdom: Animalia
- Phylum: Mollusca
- Class: Gastropoda
- Subclass: Caenogastropoda
- Order: Littorinimorpha
- Family: Ficidae
- Genus: Ficus
- Species: F. eospila

Binomial name
- Ficus eospila (Péron & Lesueur, 1807)

Synonyms
- Ficus tessellata (Kobelt, 1881); Pyrula eospila Péron & Lesueur, 1807

Species of gastropod

Ficus eospila is a species of sea snail, a marine gastropod mollusk in the family Ficidae, the fig shells.
