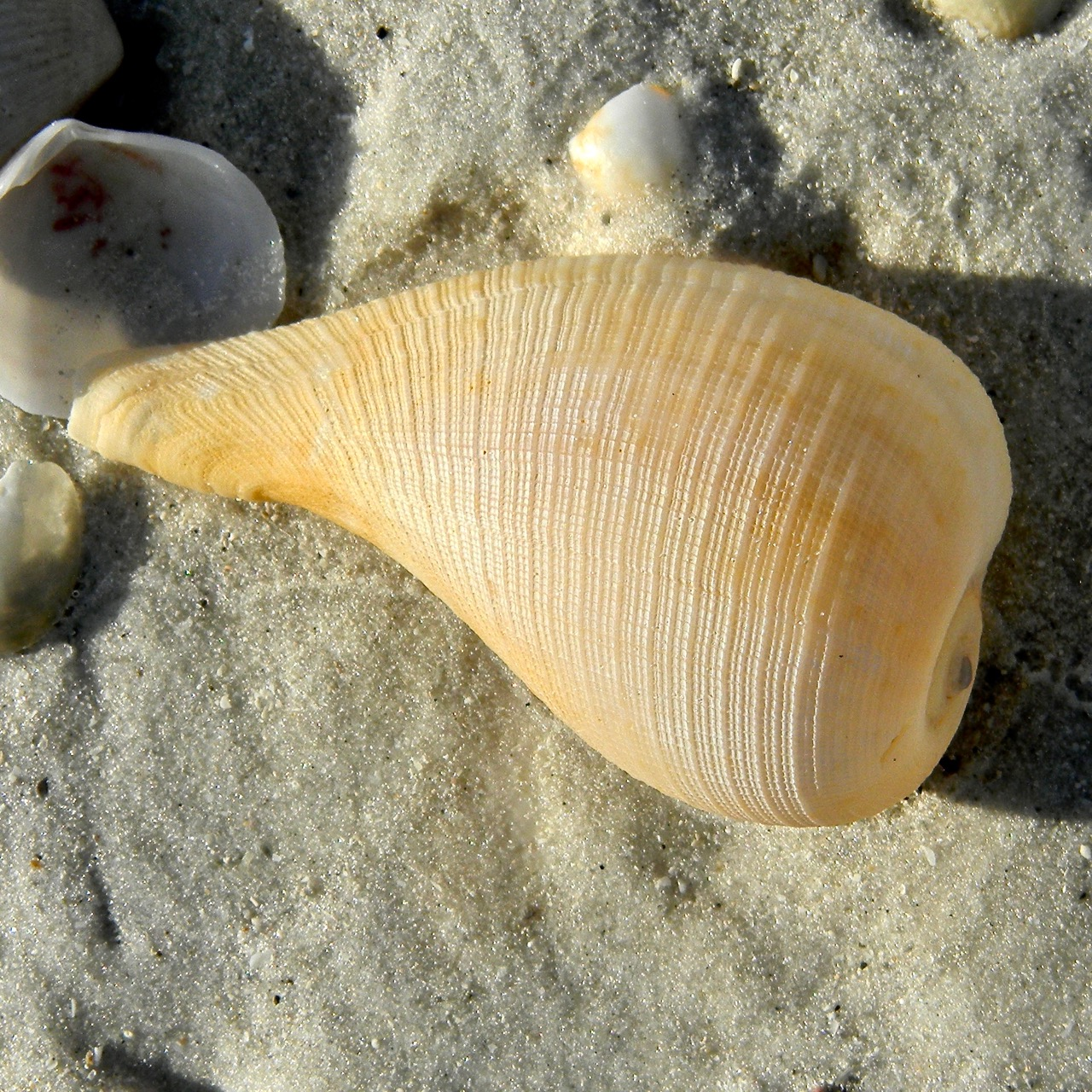

Scientific classification
- Kingdom: Animalia
- Phylum: Mollusca
- Class: Gastropoda
- Subclass: Caenogastropoda
- Order: Littorinimorpha
- Family: Ficidae
- Genus: Ficus
- Species: F. papyratia

Binomial name
- Ficus papyratia (Say, 1822)

Synonyms
- Pyrula papyratia Say, 1822

= Ficus papyratia =

Species of gastropod

Ficus papyratia is a species of sea snail, a marine gastropod mollusk in the family Ficidae, the fig shells.

== Subspecies ==
- Ficus papyratia carolae Clench, 1945
- Ficus papyratia lindae Petuch, 1988
- Ficus papyratia papyratia (Say, 1822)
- Ficus papyratia villai Petuch, 1998
