= L. gracilis =

L. gracilis may refer to:

- Laosaurus gracilis, a dinosaur species from the Late Jurassic of Wyoming
- Laxmannia gracilis, a tufted perennial herb species in the genus Laxmannia endemic to Australia
- Leiopython gracilis, a non-venomous snake species
- Leptoceratops gracilis, a primitive ceratopsian dinosaur species
- Leptodactylus gracilis, a frog species
- Leptolalax gracilis, a frog species found in Brunei, Indonesia, Malaysia and possibly Thailand
- Leptosomus gracilis, the Comoro Cuckoo-roller, a bird species
- Litsea gracilis, a plant species endemic to Malaysia

== See also ==
- Gracilis (disambiguation)
