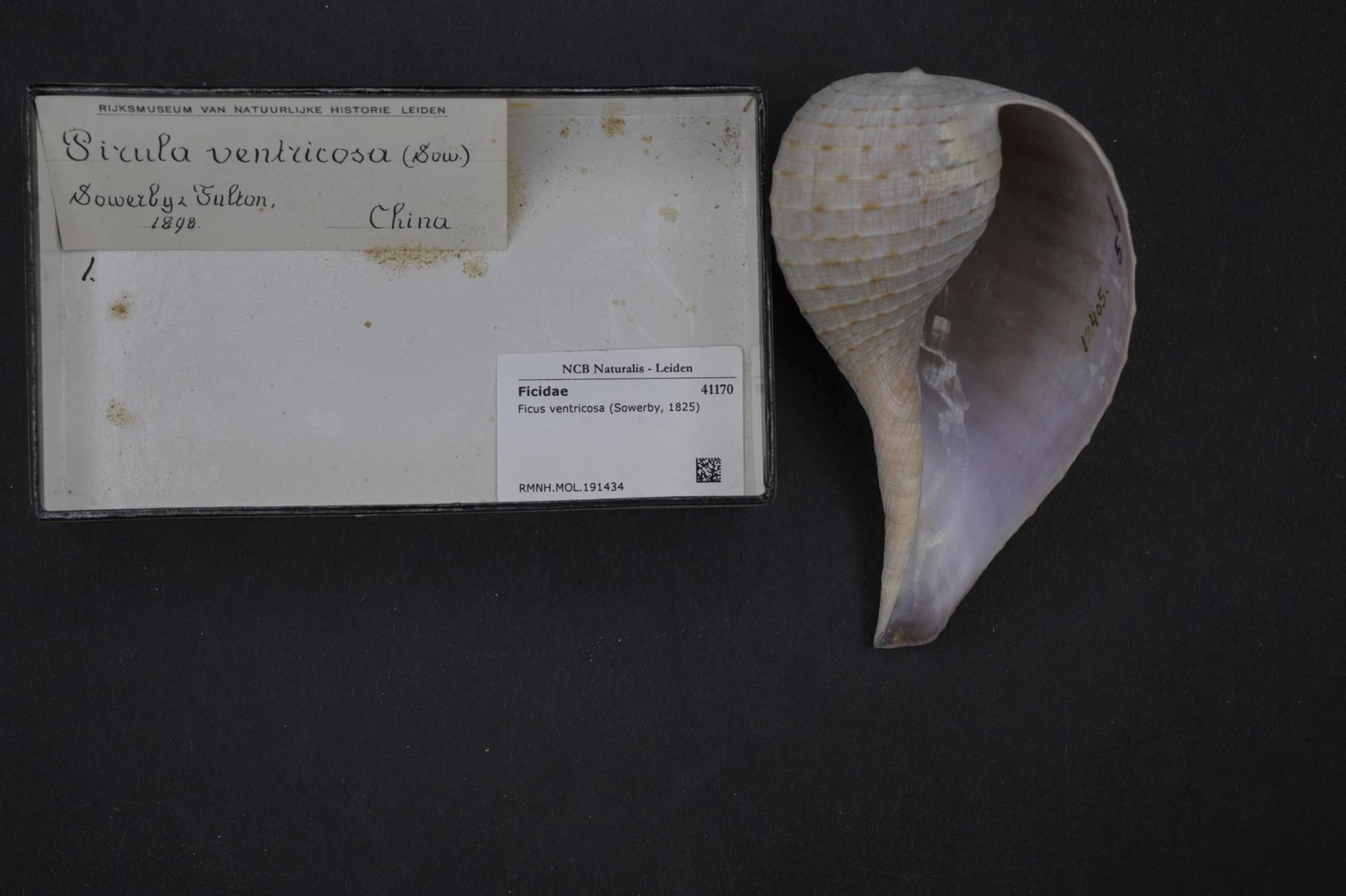

Scientific classification
- Kingdom: Animalia
- Phylum: Mollusca
- Class: Gastropoda
- Subclass: Caenogastropoda
- Order: Littorinimorpha
- Family: Ficidae
- Genus: Ficus
- Species: F. ventricosa

Binomial name
- Ficus ventricosa (Sowerby I, 1825)

Synonyms
- Pyrula ventricosa Sowerby I, 1825; Ficus ventricosa (Sowerby I, 1825) (Incorrect gender ending)

= Ficus ventricosa =

Species of gastropod

Ficus ventricosus, common name the swollen fig shell, is a species of sea snail, a marine gastropod mollusk in the family Ficidae, the fig shells.

== Description ==
The adult shell size varies between 70 mm and 150 mm.

== Distribution ==
This species is found in the Gulf of California off the coast of Mexico, and in the Pacific Ocean off Peru.
