= Ficus investigatoris =

Scientific classification
- Kingdom: Animalia
- Phylum: Mollusca
- Class: Gastropoda
- Subclass: Caenogastropoda
- Order: Littorinimorpha
- Family: Ficidae
- Genus: Ficus
- Species: F. investigatoris

Binomial name
- Ficus investigatoris (E. A. Smith, 1906)

Synonyms
- Pirula investigatoris Smith, E. A., 1906<

Species of gastropod

Ficus investigatoris is a species of sea snail, a marine gastropod mollusk in the family Ficidae, the fig shells.
