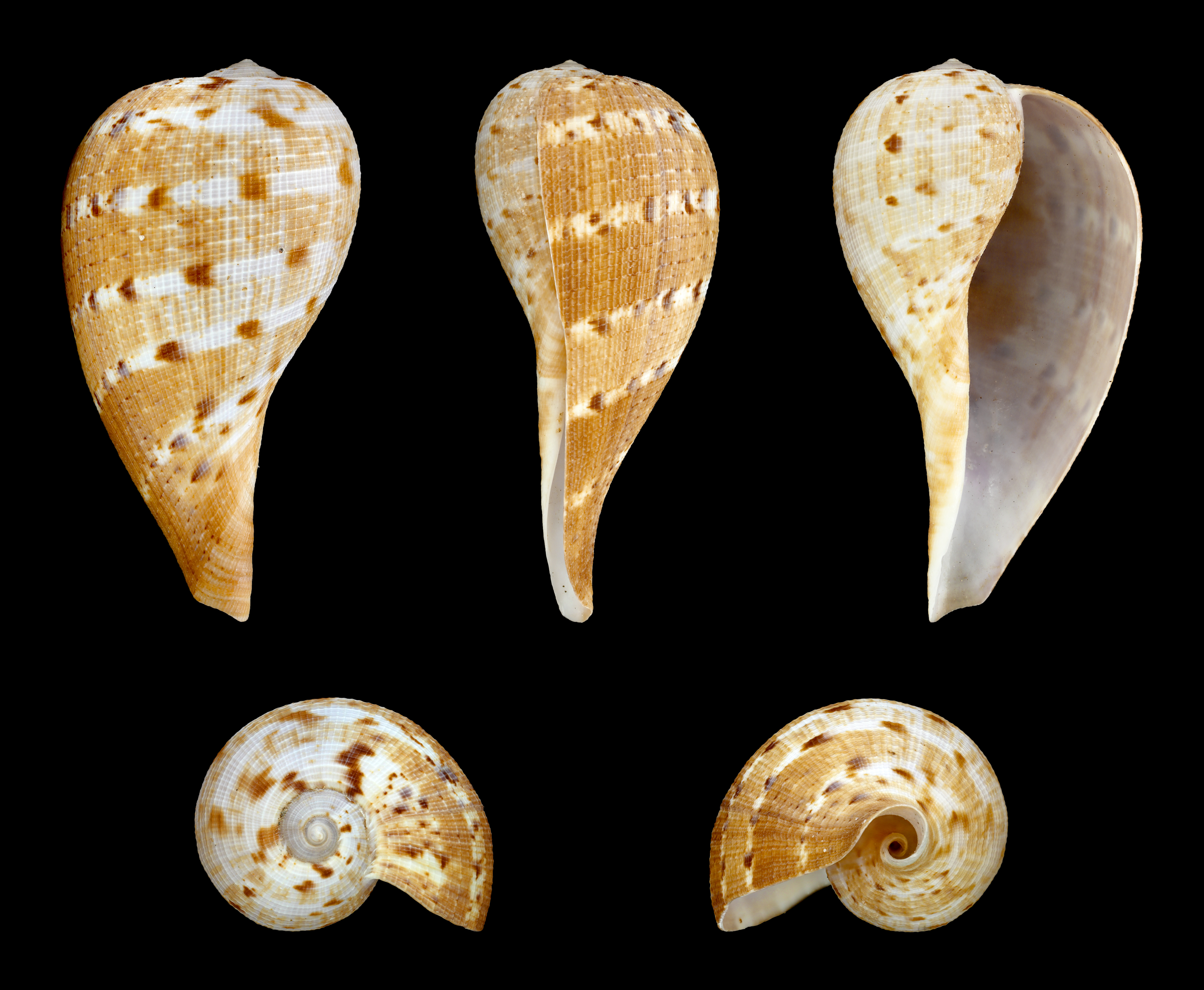

Scientific classification
- Kingdom: Animalia
- Phylum: Mollusca
- Class: Gastropoda
- Subclass: Caenogastropoda
- Order: Littorinimorpha
- Family: Ficidae
- Genus: Ficus
- Species: F. ficus

Binomial name
- Ficus ficus (Linnaeus, 1758)

Synonyms
- Bulla ficus (Linnaeus, 1758); Ficus communis Röding, 1798; Ficus ficoides (Lamarck, 1822); Ficus margaretae Iredale, 1931; Ficus subintermedius [sic] (incorrect gender ending); Ficus subintermedius (d'Orbigny, 1852); Murex ficus Linnaeus, 1758; Pyrula ficus (Linnaeus, 1758)

= Ficus ficus =

Species of gastropod

Ficus ficus or the paper fig shell is a species of sea snail, a marine gastropod mollusk in the family Ficidae, the fig shells.

== Distribution ==
Ficus ficus is found in the Indian Ocean and the West Pacific.

== Description ==
Ficus ficus is an unusual shaped thin shell being somewhat pear-shaped with a long narrow aperture and four whorls. The spire is tiny. The shell may reach 5 ins (12 cm) in length. The maximum recorded shell length is 145 mm. There is a trellis-like sculpture of fine striations on the pinkish surface. The inside is orange and there is no operculum. There is a large foot with two curved flaps near the head and a single long siphon.

== Habitat ==
The minimum recorded depth for this species is 0 m.; maximum recorded depth is 176 m.
