= B. gracilis =

B. gracilis may refer to:

- Bacteroides gracilis, a species of gram negative anaerobic bacterium
- Barbilophozia gracilis, a liverwort species in the genus Barbilophozia
- Bathysauropsis gracilis, the black lizardfish, a grinner
- Belonolaimus gracilis, the pine sting nematode, a plant pathogenic nematode
- Bletia gracilis, a species of orchid
- Bolitoglossa gracilis, a species of salamander in the family Plethodontidae endemic to Costa Rica
- Bomarea gracilis, a species of plant in the family Alstroemeriaceae endemic to Ecuador
- Bouteloua gracilis, the blue grama, a long-lived, warm season, C4 perennial grass
- Brunneria gracilis, a species of praying mantis found in Argentina, Brazil, Paraguay, Uruguay and Venezuela

== Synonyms ==
- Barosaurus gracilis, a synonym for Tornieria gracilis, a sauropod dinosaur from Late Jurassic Tanzania

== See also ==
- Gracilis (disambiguation)
