= T. gracilis =

T. gracilis may refer to:

- Taterillus gracilis, the gracile tateril or slender gerbil, a rodent species found in Africa
- Thomasomys gracilis, the slender Oldfield mouse, a rodent species found in Ecuador and Peru
- Tornieria gracilis, a dinosaur species
- Tribolonotus gracilis, a skink species found in New Guinea
- Trimeresurus gracilis, a venomous pitviper species found only in Taiwan
- Troglohyphantes gracilis, a Kočevje subterranean spider species
- Trypeta gracilis, a fruit fly species
- Tupaia gracilis, the slender treeshrew, a treeshrew species found in Indonesia and Malaysia
- Thalassina gracilis, a species of mud lobster in the genus Thalassina

== See also ==
- Gracilis (disambiguation)
