= Eusynaptomyces =

Scientific classification
- Kingdom: Fungi
- Division: Ascomycota
- Class: Laboulbeniomycetes
- Order: Laboulbeniales
- Family: Ceratomycetaceae
- Genus: Eusynaptomyces; Thaxt.

Type species
- Eusynaptomyces borealis Thaxt.

Genus of fungi

Eusynaptomyces is a genus of fungi in the family Ceratomycetaceae.
