= M. gracilis =

M. gracilis may refer to:

- Machaeranthera gracilis, a flowering plant species
- Macroramphosus gracilis, the slender snipefish, a fish species
- Madia gracilis, the grassy tarweed and slender tarweed, a flowering plant species
- Maxillaria gracilis, the delicate maxillaria, an orchid species native to eastern and southern Brazil
- Melanotaenia gracilis, the slender rainbowfish, a fish species endemic to Australia
- Melanonus gracilis, the pelagic cod, a small deepwater fish species found in the Southern Ocean
- Meliphaga gracilis, the graceful honeyeater, a bird species
- Melomys gracilis, the black-tailed mosaic-tailed rat, a rodent species
- Micrathena gracilis, the spined micrathena, a spider species
- Microcephalophis gracilis, the graceful small-headed sea snake or slender sea snake, a snake species
- Microgale gracilis, the gracile shrew tenrec, a mammal species endemic to Madagascar
- Mylochromis gracilis, a fish species endemic to Malawi
- Myurella gracilis, Lindb., a sea snail species in the genus Myurella

== See also ==
- Gracilis (disambiguation)
