= A. gracilis =

A. gracilis may refer to:

- Acanthorhodeus gracilis, the Khanka spiny bitterling, a temperate freshwater fish species
- Aechmea gracilis, a plant species endemic to Brazil
- Aepyornis gracilis, an extinct bird species
- Aglaia gracilis, a plant species endemic to Fiji
- Aldrovandia gracilis, a fish species
- Ameles gracilis, a praying mantis species found on the Canary Islands
- Ammannia gracilis, the large ammannia, red ammannia or pink ammannia, a plant species
- Anas gracilis, the grey teal, a dabbling duck species found in open wetlands in New Guinea, Australia, New Zealand, Vanuatu and Solomon
- Andropadus gracilis, the grey greenbul, a songbird species
- Antennacanthopodia gracilis, an extinct species possibly ancestral to modern day Velvet worms
- Anubias gracilis, a palm species
- Archimantis gracilis, a praying mantis species
- Argonauta gracilis, the knobby argonaut, a pelagic octopus species
- Arnica gracilis, the slender leopardbane, a plant species of the genus Arnica
- Asterella gracilis, a bryophyte species in the genus Asterella
- Atelopus gracilis, the rana jambato del Pacífico, a toad species
- Austromenidia gracilis, a fish species endemic to Chile

== Synonyms ==
- Araneus gracilis, a synonym for Argiope argentata, a spider species
- Autographa gracilis, a synonym for Plusia putnami, a moth species

== See also ==
- Gracilis (disambiguation)
