= Autoicomyces =

Scientific classification
- Kingdom: Fungi
- Division: Ascomycota
- Class: Laboulbeniomycetes
- Order: Laboulbeniales
- Family: Ceratomycetaceae
- Genus: Autoicomyces; Thaxt.

Type species
- Autoicomyces acuminatus (Thaxt.) Thaxt.

Genus of fungi

Autoicomyces is a genus of fungi in the family Ceratomycetaceae.
