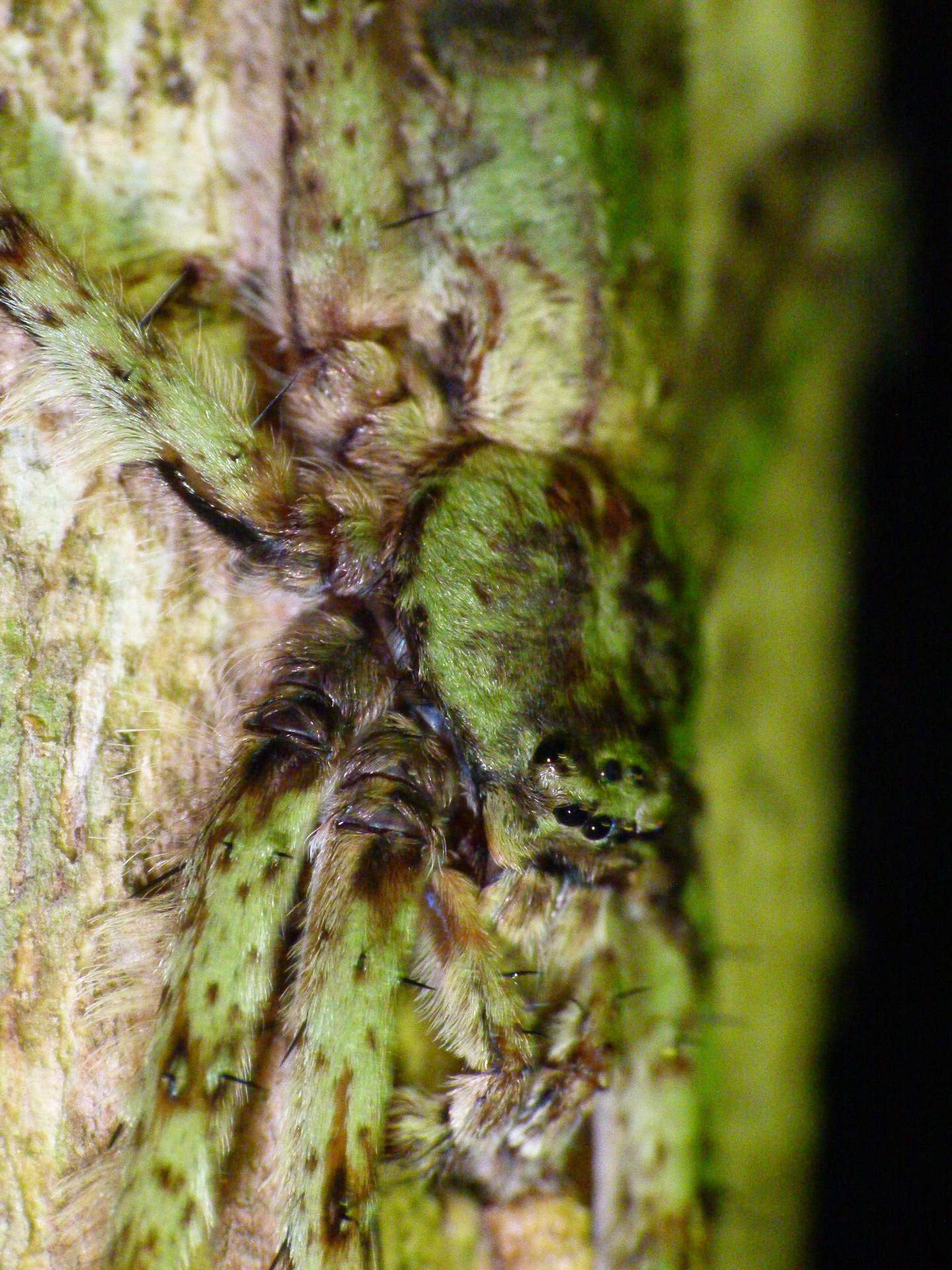
- Pandercetes cf. celatus from the Western Ghats

Scientific classification
- Kingdom: Animalia
- Phylum: Arthropoda
- Subphylum: Chelicerata
- Class: Arachnida
- Order: Araneae
- Infraorder: Araneomorphae
- Family: Sparassidae
- Genus: Pandercetes
- Species: P. celatus

Binomial name
- Pandercetes celatus Pocock, 1899

= Pandercetes celatus =

Species of spider endemic to India

Pandercetes celatus is a species of huntsman spider in the family Sparassidae. It was described by Reginald Innes Pocock in 1899 and is endemic to India.

Members of the genus Pandercetes exhibit cryptic coloration and morphology that resemble mosses and lichens, a form of camouflage seen in various arthropods associated with lichen-covered habitats.

== Taxonomy ==
The species was first described by Reginald Innes Pocock in 1899 in the Journal of the Bombay Natural History Society.

== Distribution ==
Pandercetes celatus is currently known only from India.

== See also ==
- List of spiders of India
