= Pandercetes decipiens =

Scientific classification
- Kingdom: Animalia
- Phylum: Arthropoda
- Subphylum: Chelicerata
- Class: Arachnida
- Order: Araneae
- Infraorder: Araneomorphae
- Family: Sparassidae
- Genus: Pandercetes
- Species: P. decipiens

Binomial name
- Pandercetes decipiens Pocock, 1899

Species of spider

Pandercetes decipiens, is a species of spider of the genus Pandercetes. It is native to India and Sri Lanka.
