= N. gracilis =

N. gracilis may refer to:

- Naticopsis gracilis, an extinct sea snail species in the genus Naticopsis and the family Neritopsidae
- Nectandra gracilis, a plant species found in Ecuador and Peru
- Neolamprologus gracilis, a fish species endemic to Lake Tanganyika
- Nepenthes gracilis, the slender pitcher-plant, a very common lowland pitcher plant
- Nyctosaurus gracilis, a pterodactyloid pterosaur species

== See also ==
- Gracilis (disambiguation)
