= Drepanomyces =

Scientific classification
- Kingdom: Fungi
- Division: Ascomycota
- Class: Laboulbeniomycetes
- Order: Laboulbeniales
- Family: Ceratomycetaceae
- Genus: Drepanomyces; Thaxt.

Type species
- Drepanomyces malayanus Thaxt.

Genus of fungi

Drepanomyces is a genus of fungi in the family Ceratomycetaceae. A monotypic genus, it contains the single species Drepanomyces malayanus.
