= D. gracilis =

D. gracilis may refer to:

- Dactylosaurus gracilis, a nothosaur species
- Danuria gracilis, a praying mantis species
- Deutzia gracilis, the slender deutzia, a plant species
- Diplotaxis gracilis, a species of wall rockets found in Cape Verde
- Dipterocarpus gracilis, a tree species

== Synonyms ==
- Dinichthys gracilis, a synonym for Heintzichthys gouldii, an extinct placoderm fish species of the Devonian
- Drosera gracilis, a synonym for Drosera peltata

== See also ==
- Gracilis (disambiguation)
