= Thripomyces =

Scientific classification
- Kingdom: Fungi
- Division: Ascomycota
- Class: Laboulbeniomycetes
- Order: Laboulbeniales
- Family: Ceratomycetaceae
- Genus: Thripomyces; Speg.

Type species
- Thripomyces italicus Speg.

Genus of fungi

Thripomyces is a genus of fungi in the family Ceratomycetaceae.
