= Rhynchophoromyces =

Scientific classification
- Kingdom: Fungi
- Division: Ascomycota
- Class: Laboulbeniomycetes
- Order: Laboulbeniales
- Family: Ceratomycetaceae
- Genus: Rhynchophoromyces; Thaxt.

Type species
- Rhynchophoromyces rostratus (Thaxt.) Thaxt.

Genus of fungi

Rhynchophoromyces is a genus of fungi in the family Ceratomycetaceae.
