= Fluviopupa ramsayi =

Conservation status
- Near Threatened (IUCN 2.3)

Scientific classification
- Kingdom: Animalia
- Phylum: Mollusca
- Class: Gastropoda
- Subclass: Caenogastropoda
- Order: Littorinimorpha
- Superfamily: Truncatelloidea
- Family: Tateidae
- Genus: Fluviopupa
- Species: F. ramsayi

Binomial name
- Fluviopupa ramsayi Brazier, 1889

Species of gastropod

Fluviopupa ramsayi is a species of very small freshwater snails that have an operculum, aquatic gastropod Molluscs in the family Hydrobiidae. This species is endemic to Australia.
