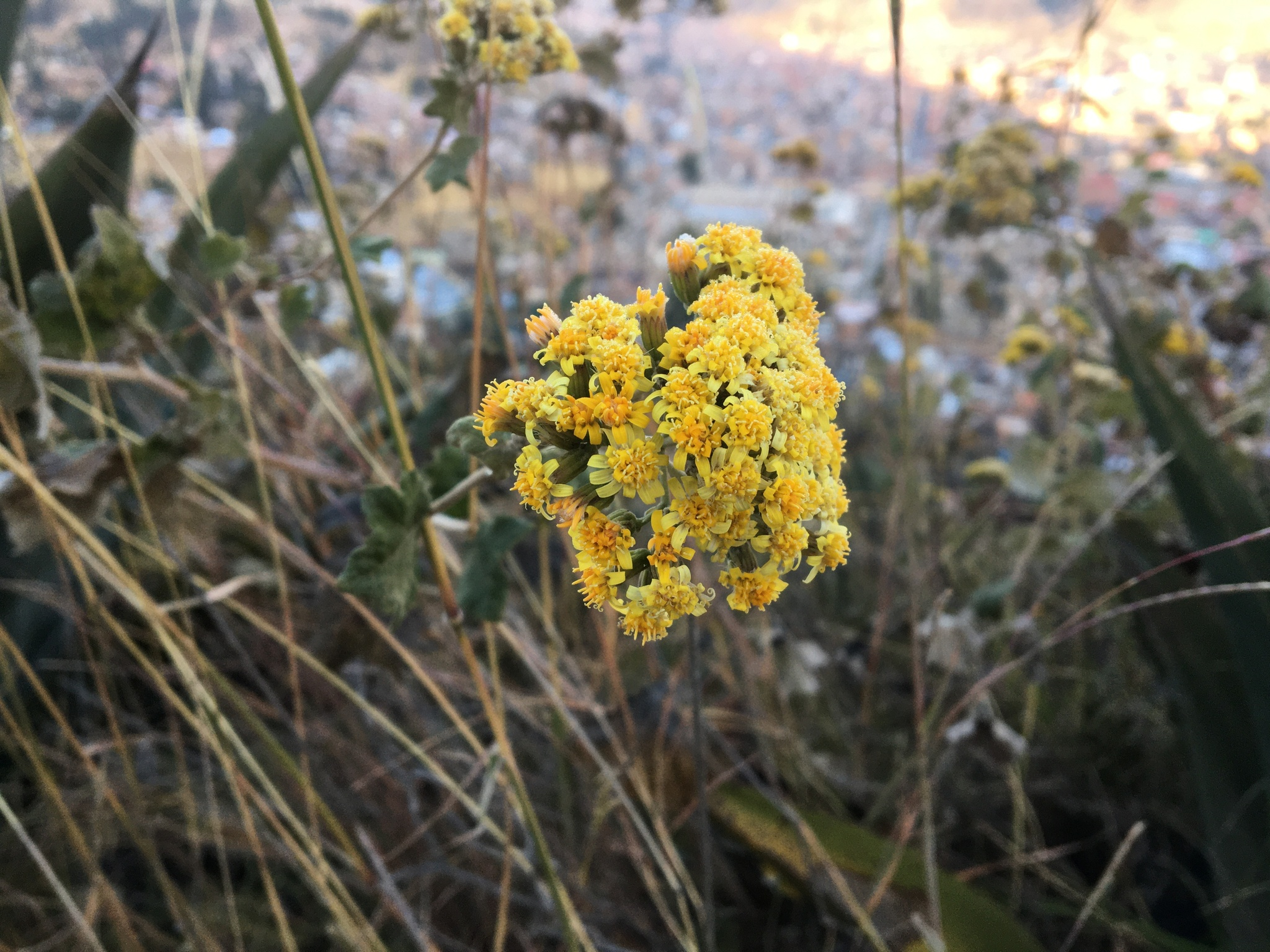

Scientific classification
- Kingdom: Plantae
- Clade: Tracheophytes
- Clade: Angiosperms
- Clade: Eudicots
- Clade: Asterids
- Order: Asterales
- Family: Asteraceae
- Genus: Jungia
- Species: J. schuerae

Binomial name
- Jungia schuerae Harling

= Jungia schuerae =

Species of plant

Jungia schuerae is a plant species native to west-central Peru. It occurs on dry, rocky open slopes at elevations of 2200–4000 m, primarily in the regions of Lima and Ancash Regions but also in neighboring areas.

Jungia schuerae is a branching shrub up to 2.5 m tall. Leaves are without stipules; blades are round to heart-shaped in general outline, up to 10 cm long and 11 cm wide, with 5–7 palmate lobes. Flower heads are born in a dense paniculate array. Each head contains 17–25 pale yellow flowers.
