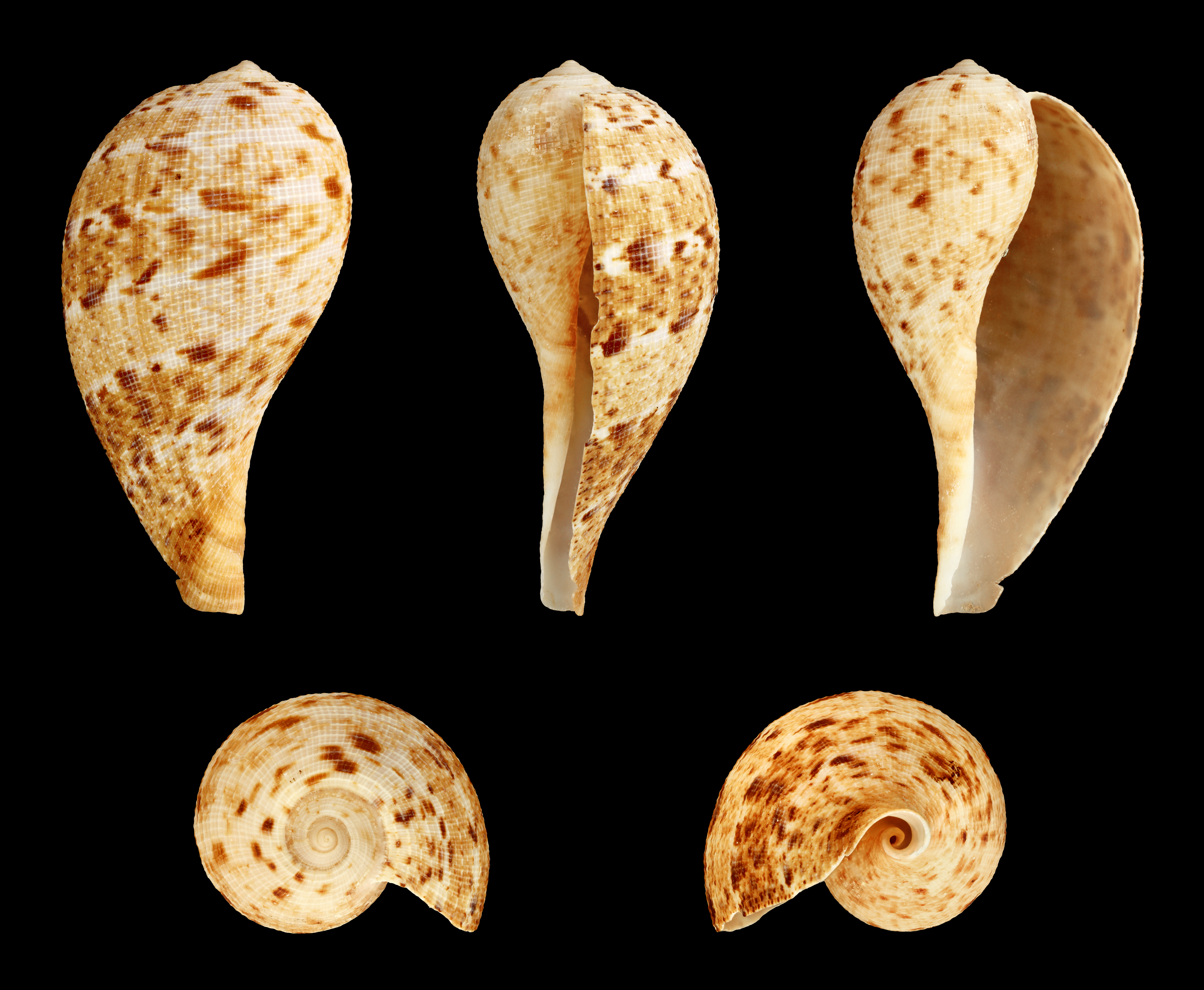

Scientific classification
- Kingdom: Animalia
- Phylum: Mollusca
- Class: Gastropoda
- Subclass: Caenogastropoda
- Order: Littorinimorpha
- Family: Ficidae
- Genus: Ficus
- Species: F. variegata

Binomial name
- Ficus variegata Röding, 1798

Synonyms
- Ficus variegatus Röding, 1798 (Incorrect gender ending)

= Ficus variegata (gastropod) =

Species of gastropod

Ficus variegata, common name the true fig shell, is a species of sea snail, a marine gastropod mollusk in the family Ficidae, the fig shells.

== Description ==
The shell size varies between 45 mm and 120 mm

== Distribution ==
This species occurs in the Indian Ocean off East Arabia and in the Pacific Ocean off Japan.
