= Pandercetes celebensis =

Scientific classification
- Kingdom: Animalia
- Phylum: Arthropoda
- Subphylum: Chelicerata
- Class: Arachnida
- Order: Araneae
- Infraorder: Araneomorphae
- Family: Sparassidae
- Genus: Pandercetes
- Species: P. celebensis

Binomial name
- Pandercetes celebensis Merian, 1911

Species of spider endemic to Indonesia

Pandercetes celebensis is a species of huntsman spider in the family Sparassidae. It was described by C. Merian in 1911 and is endemic to Sulawesi, Indonesia.

The species belongs to the genus Pandercetes, members of which are known for cryptic camouflage and lichen-like appearance on tree bark and moss-covered surfaces.

== Taxonomy ==
Pandercetes celebensis was first described by C. Merian in 1911.

There are two subspecies of this species:

- Pandercetes celebensis celebensis
- Pandercetes celebensis vulcanicola Merian, 1911

== Distribution ==
The species is known from Sulawesi in Indonesia.
