= Ceratomyces =

Scientific classification
- Kingdom: Fungi
- Division: Ascomycota
- Class: Laboulbeniomycetes
- Order: Laboulbeniales
- Family: Ceratomycetaceae
- Genus: Ceratomyces; Thaxt.

Type species
- Ceratomyces mirabilis Thaxt.

Genus of fungi

Ceratomyces is a genus of fungi in the family Ceratomycetaceae. There are approximately 20 identified species for this genus, with most species occurring on Tropisternus (Hydrophilidae, Coleoptera) from America. According to Tavares and Shen et al. The genus is characterized by a receptacle of usually 3–4 cells, outer wall cells flattened in alternate vertical rows, other 2 rows with subequal or conspicuously longer and narrower cells, rows usually appearing 3 across, wall cell tiers usually 20 or more (rarely as few as 13), and a perithecium with a slender subterminal or terminal horn (usually multicellular) on only one side.
