= Jungia mitis =

Conservation status
- Near Threatened (IUCN 3.1)

Scientific classification
- Kingdom: Plantae
- Clade: Tracheophytes
- Clade: Angiosperms
- Clade: Eudicots
- Clade: Asterids
- Order: Asterales
- Family: Asteraceae
- Genus: Jungia
- Species: J. mitis

Binomial name
- Jungia mitis Benoist

Species of flowering plant

Jungia mitis is a species of flowering plant in the family Asteraceae. It is found only in Ecuador. Its natural habitat is at high altitudes in subtropical or tropical moist montane forests. It is threatened by habitat loss.
