= Ceratomycetaceae =

Scientific classification
- Kingdom: Fungi
- Division: Ascomycota
- Class: Laboulbeniomycetes
- Order: Laboulbeniales
- Family: Ceratomycetaceae; S. Colla (1934)

Genera
- Autoicomyces; Ceratomyces; Drepanomyces; Eusynaptomyces; Helodiomyces; Phurmomyces; Plectomyces; Rhynchophoromyces; Synaptomyces; Tettigomyces; Thaumasiomyces; Thripomyces

Family of fungi

The Ceratomycetaceae are a family of fungi in the order Laboulbeniales. Taxa have a widespread distribution, and are epibiotic or parasitic on insect cuticles.
