= Gracilis =

Gracilis, a Latin adjective meaning slender, graceful or gracile, may refer to:

== Anatomy ==
- Fasciculus gracilis or Gracile fasciculus, the tract of Goll, a bundle of axon fibres in the dorsomedial spinal cord
- Gracilis muscle, the most superficial muscle on the medial side of the thigh
- Nucleus gracilis, one of the dorsal column nuclei

== Species, subspecies, synonyms, hybrids and varieties ==
- A. gracilis (disambiguation), numerous species
- B. gracilis (disambiguation), numerous species
- C. gracilis (disambiguation), numerous species
- D. gracilis (disambiguation), numerous species
- E. gracilis (disambiguation), numerous species
- F. gracilis (disambiguation), numerous species
- H. gracilis (disambiguation), numerous species
- J. gracilis (disambiguation), numerous species
- L. gracilis (disambiguation), numerous species
- M. gracilis (disambiguation), numerous species
- Mentha × gracilis – a mint hybrid
- N. gracilis (disambiguation), numerous species
- P. gracilis (disambiguation), numerous species
- S. gracilis (disambiguation), numerous species
- Spiranthes lacera var. gracilis, a subspecies in the orchid species Spiranthes lacera
- T. gracilis (disambiguation), numerous species
- Ulmus minor 'Umbraculifera Gracilis', an elm cultivar
- Uropsilus gracilis, gracile shrew mole
- Urtica gracilis, the American stinging nettle
- Utricularia neglecta f. gracilis, a synonym for Utricularia australis, a plant species
- Xantusia gracilis, sandstone night lizard
- Yelovichnus gracilis, a species of enigmatic Ediacaran fossil

== See also ==
- Graciliscincus, a species of Scincidae lizard
- Gracilisuchus, the "graceful crocodile", an extinct genus of tiny crurotarsan (crocodilians ancestors) from the Middle Triassic
- List of Roman cognomina
