= S. gracilis =

S. gracilis may refer to:

- Sageretia gracilis, a shrub species with slightly shiny dark green leaves and yellow-green flowers
- Sarcocystis gracilis, a parasitic protozoan species in the genus Sarcocystis infecting dogs
- Saurida gracilis, the gracile lizardfish, a fish species found in the Indo- pacific region
- Scaphispatha gracilis, a plant species endemic to South America
- Sellosaurus gracilis, a prosauropod dinosaur species of Triassic Europe
- Senoculus gracilis, a spider species in the genus Senoculus found from Guyana to Argentina
- Sepiadarium gracilis, a cuttlefish species native to the Indo-Pacific
- Sillago gracilis, the trumpeter whiting, a fish species
- Sloanea gracilis, a plant species endemic to Suriname
- Smilodectes gracilis, an adapiformes primate species from the early Eocene
- Smilodon gracilis, the slender smilodon, an extinct carnivorous mammal species
- Spartina gracilis, the alkali cordgrass, a plant species
- Sphodromantis gracilis, a praying mantis species found in the Transvaal
- Spilogale gracilis, the Western spotted skunk
- Spratelloides gracilis, the slender sprat, a sprat fish species
- Stemonoporus gracilis, a plant species endemic to Sri Lanka
- Streptocephalus gracilis, a crustacean species endemic to South Africa
- Syrnolopsis gracilis, a gastropod species

== Synonyms ==
- Scaphyglottis gracilis, a synonym for Scaphyglottis prolifera
- Segestria gracilis, a synonym for Segestria florentina
- Slabberina gracilis, a synonym for Eurydice pulchra

== See also ==
- Gracilis (disambiguation)
