= Herpomycetaceae =

Scientific classification
- Kingdom: Fungi
- Division: Ascomycota
- Class: Laboulbeniomycetes
- Order: Herpomycetales
- Family: Herpomycetaceae; I.I. Tav. (1981)

Genera
- Herpomyces

Family of fungi

The Herpomycetaceae are a family of fungi in the order Herpomycetales. Taxa have a widespread distribution, and are ectoparasitic or epibiotic on cockroaches (family Blattidae).
