= Helodiomyces =

Scientific classification
- Kingdom: Fungi
- Division: Ascomycota
- Class: Laboulbeniomycetes
- Order: Laboulbeniales
- Family: Ceratomycetaceae
- Genus: Helodiomyces; F. Picard

Type species
- Helodiomyces elegans F.Picard

Genus of fungi

Helodiomyces is a genus of fungi in the family Ceratomycetaceae. A monotypic genus, it contains the single species Helodiomyces elegans.
