= Pandercetes plumipes =

Scientific classification
- Kingdom: Animalia
- Phylum: Arthropoda
- Subphylum: Chelicerata
- Class: Arachnida
- Order: Araneae
- Infraorder: Araneomorphae
- Family: Sparassidae
- Genus: Pandercetes
- Species: P. plumipes

Binomial name
- Pandercetes plumipes (Doleschall, 1859)

Species of spider

Pandercetes plumipes, is a species of spider of the genus Pandercetes. It is native to Ambon Islands, Sri Lanka and New Guinea.
