= Fluviopupa =

Scientific classification
- Kingdom: Animalia
- Phylum: Mollusca
- Class: Gastropoda
- Subclass: Caenogastropoda
- Order: Littorinimorpha
- Family: Tateidae
- Genus: Fluviopupa; Pilsbry, 1911

Type species
- Fluviopupa pupoidea Pilsbry, 1911

Synonyms
- Fluviorissoina Iredale, 1944; Pupidrobia Iredale, 1944

Genus of gastropods

Fluviopupa is a genus of very small freshwater snails that have an operculum, aquatic gastropod mollusks in the family Tateidae.

== Species ==
Species within the genus Flaviopupa include:

- Fluviopupa adkinsi Zielske & Haase, 2014
- Fluviopupa bakeri Zielske & Haase, 2014
- Fluviopupa brevior (Ancey, 1905)
- Fluviopupa daunivucu Haase, Ponder & Bouchet, 2006
- Fluviopupa derua Haase, Ponder & Bouchet, 2006
- Fluviopupa erromangoana Zielske & Haase, 2014
- Fluviopupa espiritusantoana Haase, Fontaine & Gargominy, 2010
- Fluviopupa freswota Zielske & Haase, 2014
- Fluviopupa gracilis (Iredale, 1944)
- Fluviopupa herminae Zielske & Haase, 2014
- Fluviopupa irinimeke Haase, Ponder & Bouchet, 2006
- Fluviopupa kessneri Ponder & Shea, 2014
- Fluviopupa lali Haase, Ponder & Bouchet, 2006
- Fluviopupa lalinimeke Haase, Ponder & Bouchet, 2006
- Fluviopupa malekulana Zielske & Haase, 2014
- Fluviopupa mekeniyaqona Haase, Ponder & Bouchet, 2006
- Fluviopupa mekewesi Haase, Ponder & Bouchet, 2006
- Fluviopupa melissae Haase, Fontaine & Gargominy, 2010
- Fluviopupa narii Haase, Fontaine & Gargominy, 2010
- Fluviopupa pascali Haase, Fontaine & Gargominy, 2010
- Fluviopupa pentecostata Zielske & Haase, 2014
- Fluviopupa pikinini Zielske & Haase, 2014
- Fluviopupa priei Haase, Fontaine & Gargominy, 2010
- Fluviopupa pupoidea Pilsbry, 1911
- Fluviopupa ramsayi (Brazier, 1889)
- Fluviopupa riva Zielske & Haase, 2014
- Fluviopupa seasea Haase, Ponder & Bouchet, 2006
- Fluviopupa smolwan Haase, Fontaine & Gargominy, 2010
- Fluviopupa snel Haase, Fontaine & Gargominy, 2010
- Fluviopupa tangbunia Zielske & Haase, 2014
- Fluviopupa titusi Haase, Fontaine & Gargominy, 2010
- Fluviopupa torresiana Haase, Fontaine & Gargominy, 2010
- Fluviopupa vakamalolo Haase, Ponder & Bouchet, 2006
- Fluviopupa walterlinii Haase, Fontaine & Gargominy, 2010
