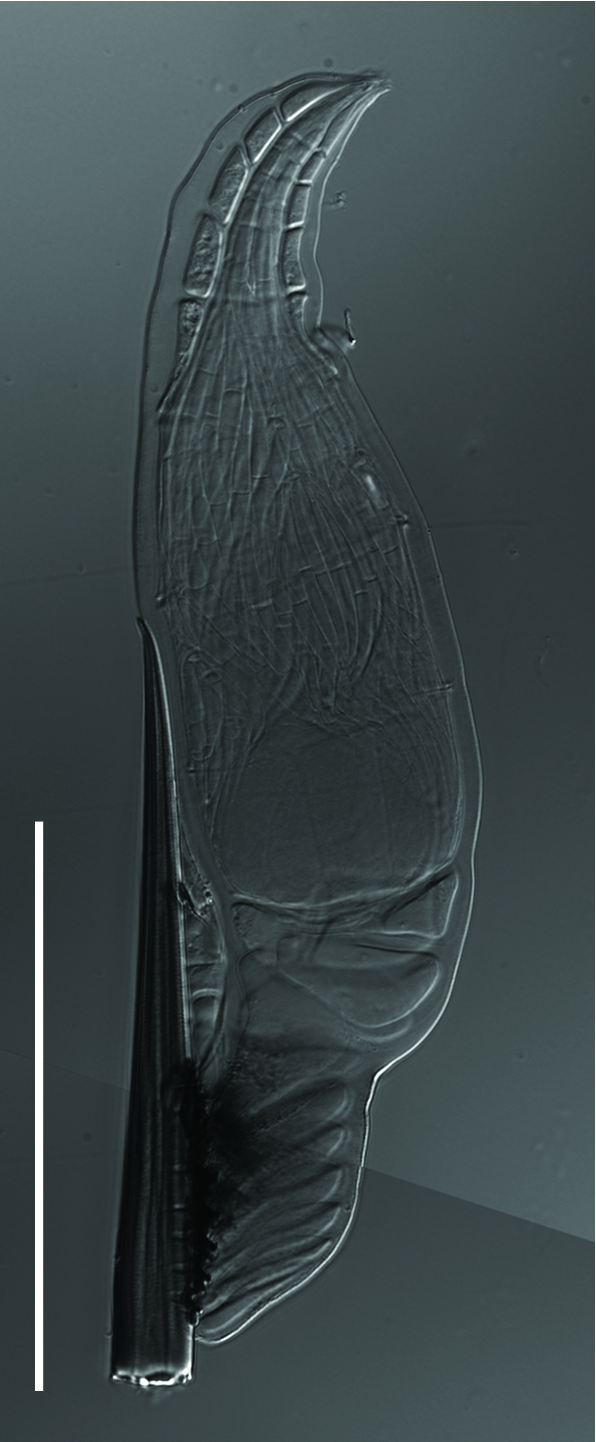
- Female thallus of Herpomyces chaetophilus, removed from a Periplaneta americana cockroach

Scientific classification
- Kingdom: Fungi
- Division: Ascomycota
- Class: Laboulbeniomycetes
- Order: Herpomycetales; Haelew. & Pfister (2019)

Families
- Herpomycetaceae

= Herpomycetales =

Order of fungi

The Herpomycetales is an order of fungi within the class Laboulbeniomycetes. The order includes a single dioecious genus, Herpomyces, with 27 accepted species of obligate ectoparasites that are associated exclusively with cockroaches. Like the Laboulbeniales order, they produce cellular thalli. However, the thalli of Herpomyces are developmentally and morphologically unique.

The order was described in 2019 based on the phylogenetic analysis of three gene regions. A more recent phylogeny found that Herpomycetales and Laboulbeniales are not sister clades, which provides evidence for the idea that the thallus originated at least twice in the class Laboulbeniomycetes. This is in line with the fact that thalli of both orders are developmentally and morphologically different.

The draft genome of Herpomyces periplanetae has been sequenced and assembled—the only one in the class thus far. Herpomyces periplanetae is a very widespread parasite on the antennae of adult cockroaches in the genus Periplaneta, like the common American cockroach, Periplaneta americana.
