= Ficopsis =

Ficopsis Temporal range: Paleocene - Miocene

Scientific classification
- Kingdom: Animalia
- Phylum: Mollusca
- Class: Gastropoda
- Subclass: Caenogastropoda
- Order: Littorinimorpha
- Family: Ficidae
- Genus: †Ficopsis; Conrad, 1866

Extinct genus of gastropods

Ficopsis is an extinct genus of large sea snails, marine gastropod mollusks in the family Ficidae, the fig snails.

This species lived from the Paleocene to the Miocene in Africa, Asia, Europe, North America, and South America.
