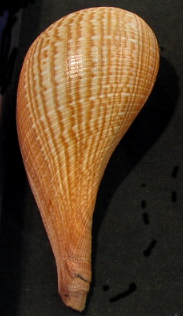
- Dorsal view of a shell of Ficus gracilis
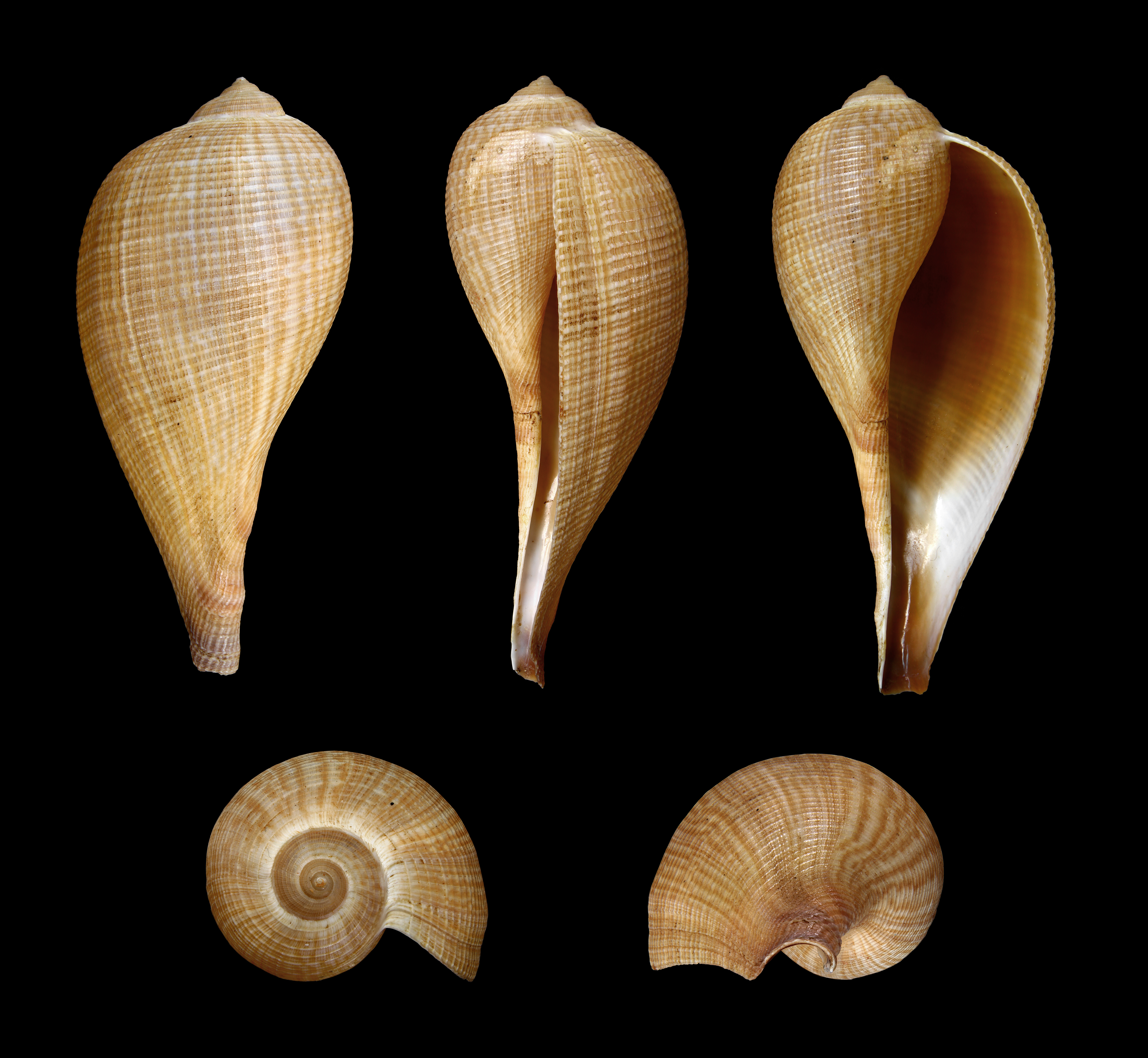
- Five views of a shell of Ficus gracilis

Scientific classification
- Kingdom: Animalia
- Phylum: Mollusca
- Class: Gastropoda
- Subclass: Caenogastropoda
- Order: Littorinimorpha
- Superfamily: Ficoidea
- Family: Ficidae
- Genus: Ficus; Röding, 1798

Type species
- Ficus ficus Linnaeus, 1758

Synonyms
- Ficula Swainson, 1835; † Ficus (Ficopsis) Conrad, 1866 · accepted, alternate representation; Pirula Montfort, 1810; Pyrula Lamarck, 1799; Sycotypus Gray, 1847

= Ficus (gastropod) =

Genus of sea snails

Ficus is a genus of large sea snails, marine gastropod mollusks in the family Ficidae, the fig shells.

This is the type of the family Ficidae. Previously it has been categorized in the family Muricidae by Tryon, 1873) and Tritonidae (by Mörch)

== Description ==
The light, pyriform shell is ventricose, ribbed, and cancellated. The spire very short. The aperture large. The smooth columella is simple. The elongated canal is straight. The thin outer lip is entire. There is no umbilicus.

== Species ==
Species within the genus Ficus include:

- † Ficus condita (Brongniart, 1823)
- Ficus dandrimonti Lorenz, 2012
- Ficus eospila (Péron & Lesueur, 1807)
- † Ficus ficoides (Brocchi, 1814)
- Ficus ficus Linnaeus, 1758
- Ficus filosa (Sowerby III, 1892)
- † Ficus geometra (Borson, 1825)
- Ficus gracilis (Sowerby I, 1825)
- † Ficus imperfecta P. Marshall & R. Murdoch, 1919
- † Ficus holmesii Conrad, 1867
- Ficus investigatoris (Smith, 1906)
- † Ficus pannus (Deshayes, 1864)
- Ficus papyratia (Say, 1822)
- † Ficus parva Suter, 1917
- † Ficus parvissima Harzhauser, Raven & Landau, 2018
- Ficus pellucida Deshayes, 1856
- † Ficus pilsbryi (Smith, 1907)
- † Ficus retinduta (de Gregorio, 1880)
- Ficus schneideri Morrison, 2016
- † Ficus subintermedia (d'Orbigny, 1852)
- Ficus variegata Röding, 1798
- Ficus ventricosa (Sowerby I, 1825)
- Ficus vosi H. Morrison, 2020

Species brought into synonymy

- Ficus atlanticus Clench & Aguayo, 1940 : synonym of Ficus pellucida Deshayes, 1856
- Ficus carolae Clench, 1945 : synonym of Ficus papyratia carolae Clench, 1945
- Ficus communis Röding, 1798 : synonym of Ficus ficus (Linnaeus, 1758)
- Ficus ficoides (Lamarck, 1822) : synonym of Ficus ficus (Linnaeus, 1758)
- Ficus filosus (Sowerby III, 1892) : synonym of Ficus filosa (Sowerby III, 1892)
- Ficus howelli Clench & Aguayo, 1940 : synonym of Ficus pellucida Deshayes, 1856
- Ficus lindae Petuch, 1988 : synonym of Ficus papyratia lindae Petuch, 1988
- Ficus margaretae Iredale, 1931 : synonym of Ficus ficus (Linnaeus, 1758)
- Ficus pellucidus Deshayes, 1856 accepted as Ficus pellucida Deshayes, 1856
- Ficus subintermedius (d'Orbigny, 1852) : synonym of Ficus subintermedia (d'Orbigny, 1852)
- Ficus tessellatus (Kobelt, 1881) : synonym of Ficus eospila (Péron & Lesueur, 1807)
- Ficus variegatus Röding, 1798 : synonym of Ficus variegata Röding, 1798
- Ficus ventricosus (Sowerby I, 1825) : synonym of Ficus ventricosa (Sowerby I, 1825)
- Ficus villai Petuch, 1998: synonym of Ficus papyratia villai Petuch, 1998
