= Thaumasiomyces =

Scientific classification
- Kingdom: Fungi
- Division: Ascomycota
- Class: Laboulbeniomycetes
- Order: Laboulbeniales
- Family: Ceratomycetaceae
- Genus: Thaumasiomyces; Thaxt.

Type species
- Thaumasiomyces scabellularius Thaxt.

Genus of fungi

Thaumasiomyces is a genus of fungi in the family Ceratomycetaceae.
