= Fluviopupa gracilis =

Conservation status
- Near Threatened (IUCN 2.3)

Scientific classification
- Kingdom: Animalia
- Phylum: Mollusca
- Class: Gastropoda
- Subclass: Caenogastropoda
- Order: Littorinimorpha
- Superfamily: Truncatelloidea
- Family: Tateidae
- Genus: Fluviopupa
- Species: F. gracilis

Binomial name
- Fluviopupa gracilis Iredale, 1944

Synonyms
- Pupidrobia gracilis Iredale, 1944 (original combination)

Species of gastropod

Fluviopupa gracilis is a species of very small freshwater snails that have an operculum, aquatic gastropod mollusks in the family Tateidae.

== Distribution ==
This species is endemic to Australia.
