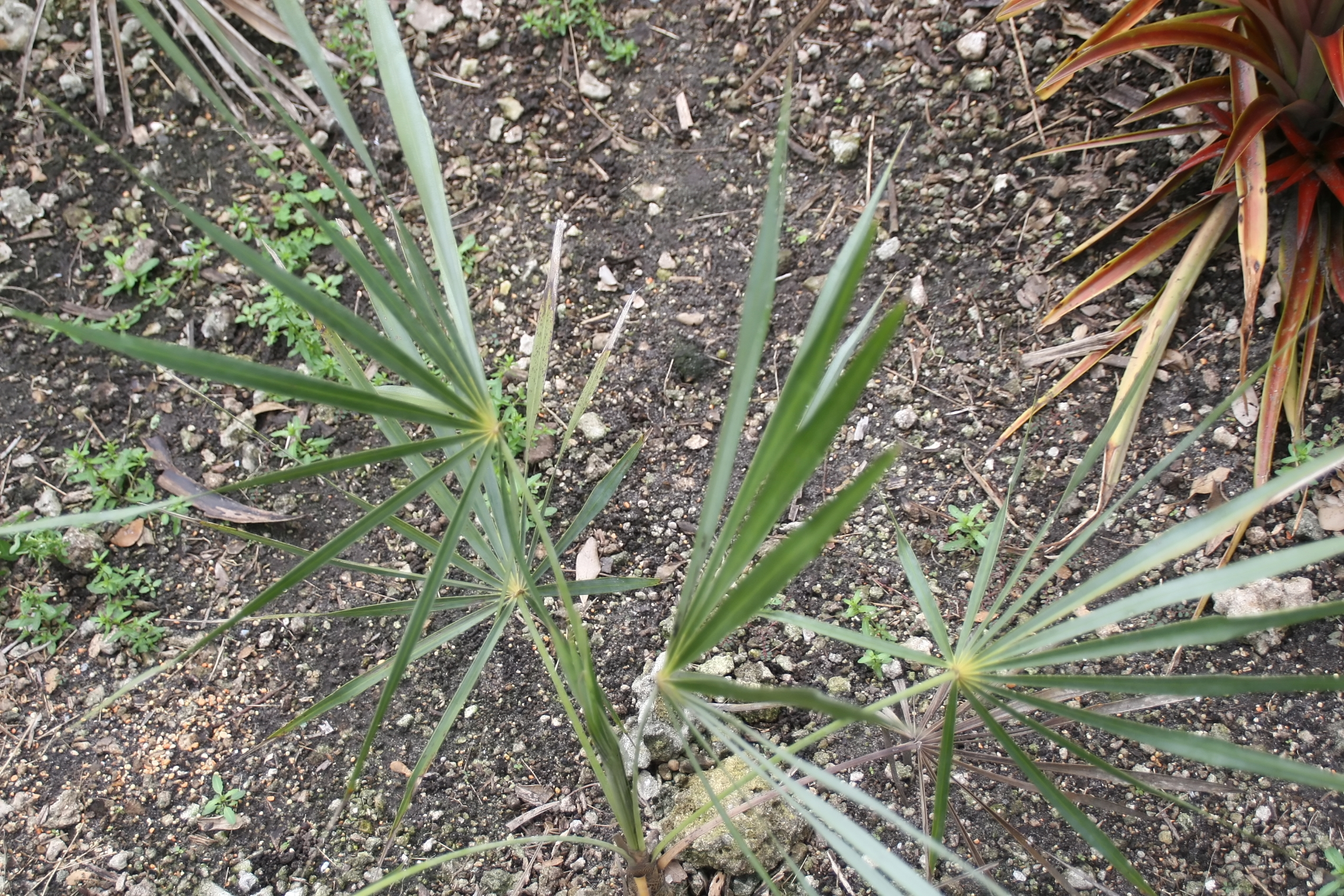

Scientific classification
- Kingdom: Plantae
- Clade: Tracheophytes
- Clade: Angiosperms
- Clade: Monocots
- Clade: Commelinids
- Order: Arecales
- Family: Arecaceae
- Genus: Coccothrinax
- Species: C. gracilis

Binomial name
- Coccothrinax gracilis Burret

= Coccothrinax gracilis =

Species of palm

Coccothrinax gracilis (latanier) is a palm which is endemic to the island of Hispaniola.

== Description ==
A slender, small-statured fan palm native to Haiti and the Dominican Republic, Coccothrinax gracilis reaches up to 10 m in height, with a narrow, smooth trunk up to 15 cm in diameter. It thrives in hot, bright conditions and is well-adapted to tropical and subtropical climates, displaying strong tolerance to both sun and salt. The leaves are completely circular, rigid, and deeply segmented, with a striking silvery hue on the undersides. This species closely resembles Coccothrinax miraguama, though it remains distinct in its finer proportions and compact growth habit.
