= Hetschkia =

- female H. gracilis

Scientific classification
- Kingdom: Animalia
- Phylum: Arthropoda
- Subphylum: Chelicerata
- Class: Arachnida
- Order: Araneae
- Infraorder: Araneomorphae
- Family: Theridiidae
- Genus: Hetschkia; Keyserling, 1886
- Species: H. gracilis

Binomial name
- Hetschkia gracilis Keyserling, 1886

Genus of spiders

Hetschkia is a monotypic genus of Brazilian comb-footed spiders containing the single species, Hetschkia gracilis. It was first described by Eugen von Keyserling in 1886, and is found in Brazil.

Females have a body length of 2.2 millimetres (0.087 in).
