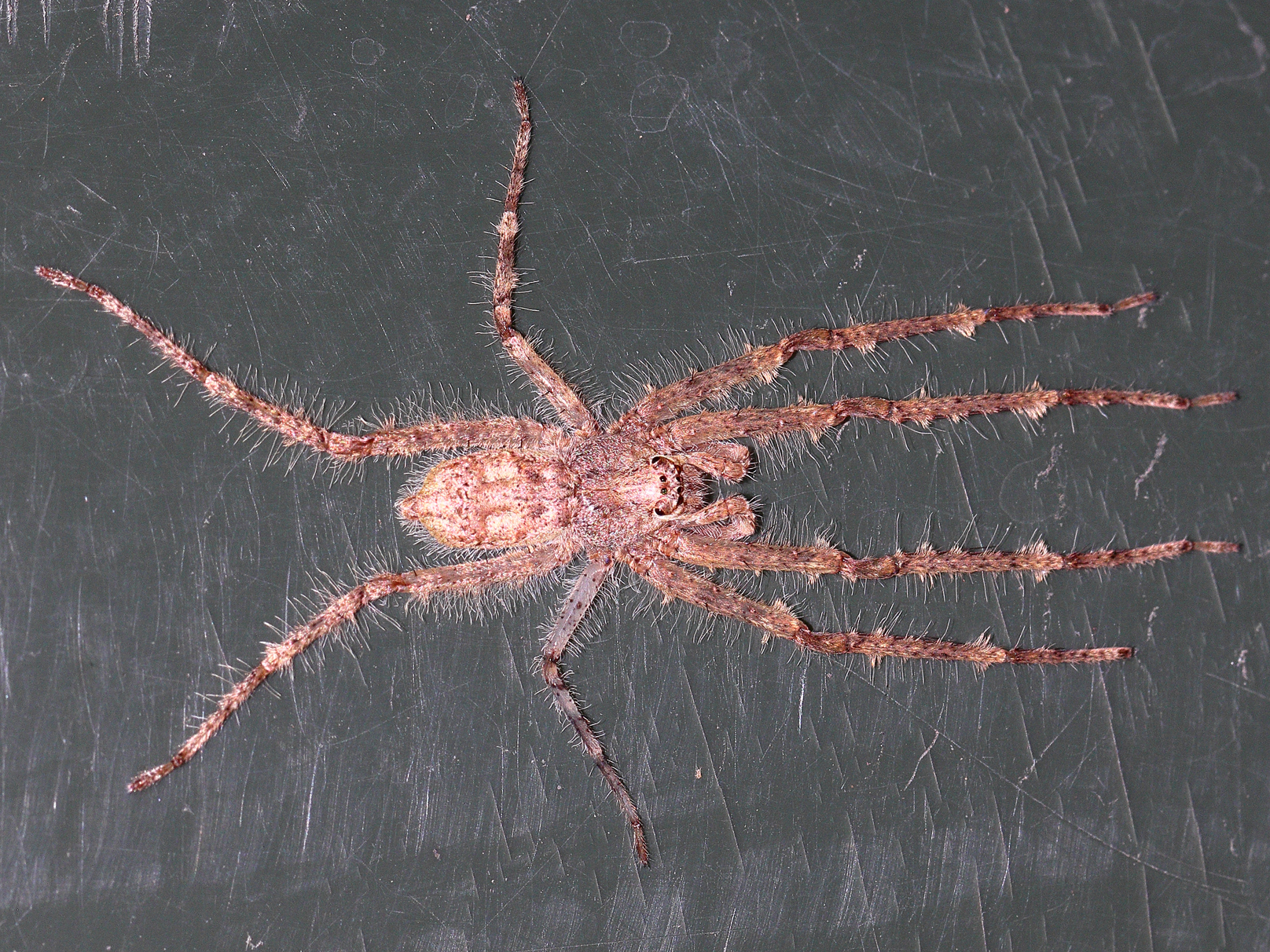
- Cairns, Queensland, Australia

Scientific classification
- Kingdom: Animalia
- Phylum: Arthropoda
- Subphylum: Chelicerata
- Class: Arachnida
- Order: Araneae
- Infraorder: Araneomorphae
- Family: Sparassidae
- Genus: Pandercetes
- Species: P. gracilis

Binomial name
- Pandercetes gracilis C.L. Koch, 1875

= Pandercetes gracilis =

Lichen huntsman spider

Species of spider

Pandercetes gracilis, also called the lichen huntsman spider and the lichen spider, is a huntsman spider found on New Guinea, the Maluku Islands, Sulawesi, and in Queensland, Australia. Individuals can vary in color and many color forms exist, but unlike squids and certain reptiles, color is fixed at its previous molt. It hunts by hiding among moss and lichen, then ambushing prey that comes into range by pouncing on it.
