= Bomarea gracilis =

Conservation status
- Vulnerable (IUCN 3.1)

Scientific classification
- Kingdom: Plantae
- Clade: Tracheophytes
- Clade: Angiosperms
- Clade: Monocots
- Order: Liliales
- Family: Alstroemeriaceae
- Genus: Bomarea
- Species: B. gracilis

Binomial name
- Bomarea gracilis Sodiro

Species of flowering plant

Bomarea gracilis is a species of flowering plant in the family Alstroemeriaceae. It is endemic to Ecuador. It grows in forest and páramo in the Andes.
