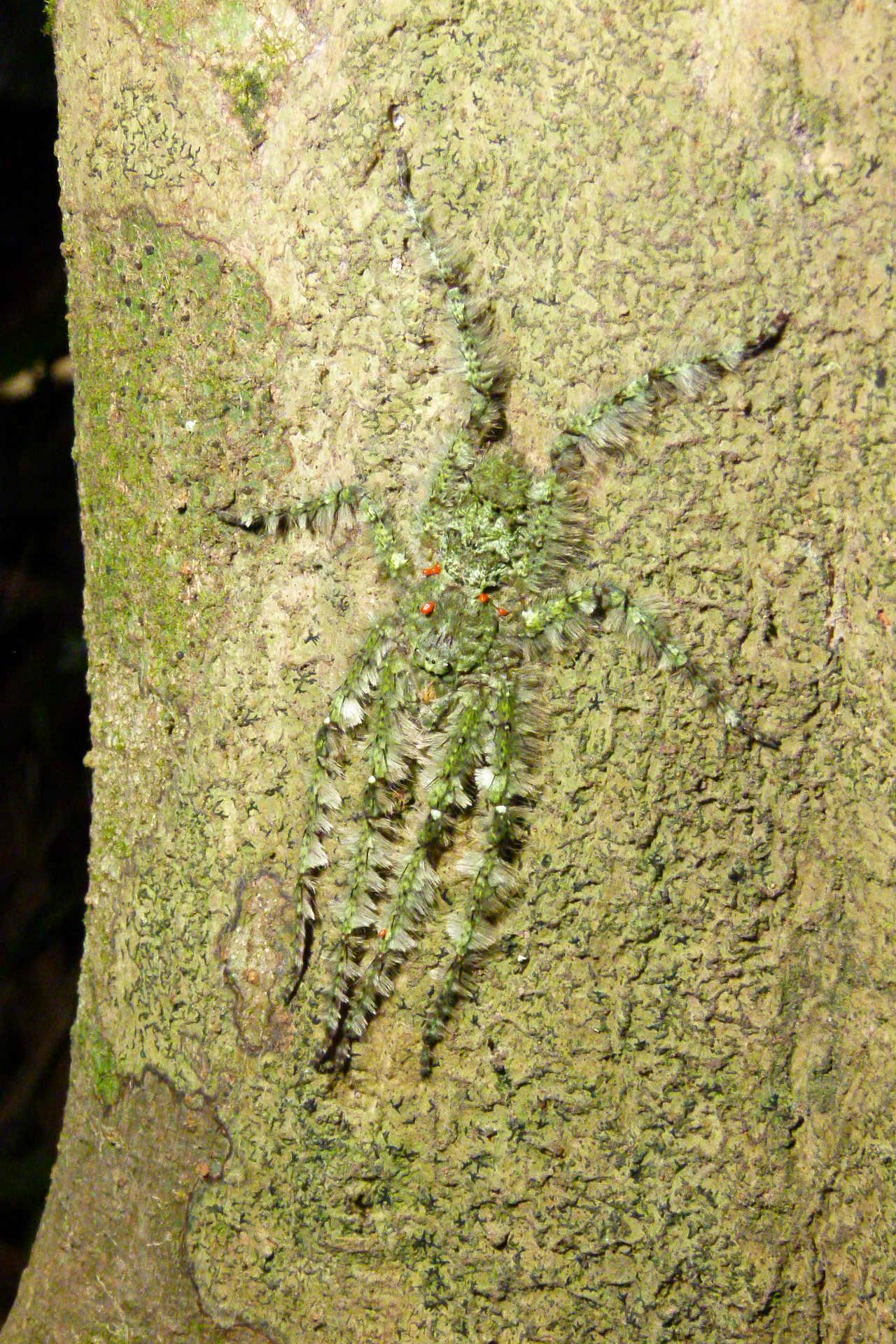
- Pandercetes cf. celatus from the Western Ghats showing typical cryptic patterning

Scientific classification
- Kingdom: Animalia
- Phylum: Arthropoda
- Subphylum: Chelicerata
- Class: Arachnida
- Order: Araneae
- Infraorder: Araneomorphae
- Family: Sparassidae
- Genus: Pandercetes; L. Koch, 1875

Type species
- P. gracilis L. Koch, 1875

Species
- 16, see text

= Pandercetes =

Genus of spiders

Pandercetes is a genus of huntsman spiders that was first described by Ludwig Carl Christian Koch in his 1875 treatise on Australian spiders. They are mainly distributed in tropical Asia and Australia, and are known for their cryptic coloration that matches local moss and lichen. Their legs have lateral hairs, giving them a feathery appearance, further masking their outline against tree trunks. Their head is somewhat elevated and the carapace has the thoracic region low and flat.

The genus is characterized by the internal anatomy of the reproductive structures. Males have irregular coils at the terminal end, while females have screw like copulatory ducts.

== Species ==
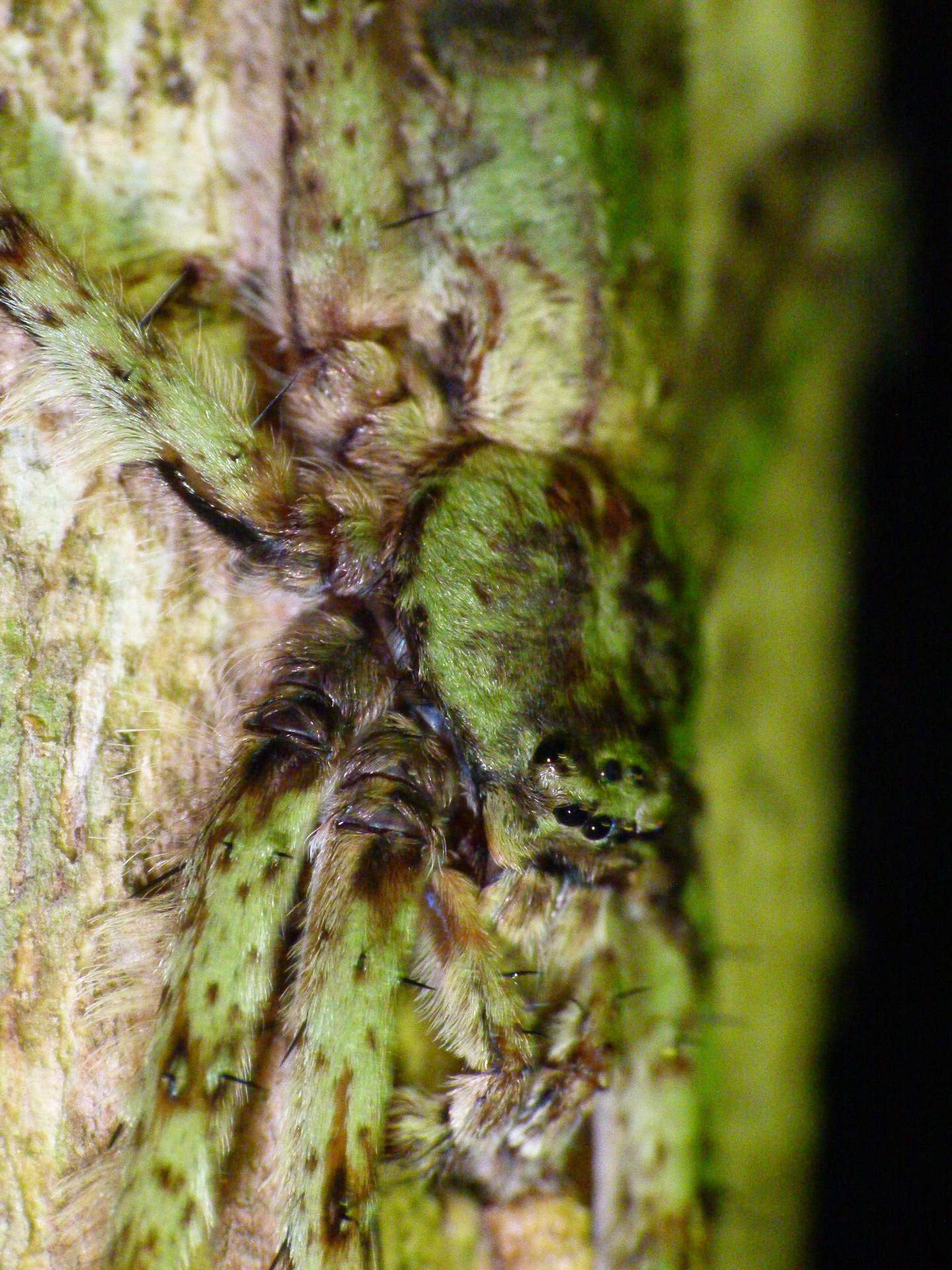
Showing moss-like appearance and the head elevated above the plane of the cephalothorax

As of October 2019 it contains sixteen species and one subspecies, found in tropical forests in Asia, extending east to Australia:

- Pandercetes celatus Pocock, 1899 – India
- Pandercetes celebensis Merian, 1911 – Indonesia (Sulawesi)
  - Pandercetes c. vulcanicola Merian, 1911 – Indonesia (Sulawesi)
- Pandercetes decipiens Pocock, 1899 – India, Sri Lanka
- Pandercetes gracilis L. Koch, 1875 (type) – Indonesia (Moluccas, Sulawesi), New Guinea, Australia (Queensland)
- Pandercetes isopus Thorell, 1881 – Indonesia (Moluccas), New Guinea
- Pandercetes longipes Thorell, 1881 – Papua New Guinea (Yule Is.)
- Pandercetes macilentus Thorell, 1895 – Myanmar
- Pandercetes malleator Thorell, 1890 – Malaysia, Indonesia (Aru Is.)
- Pandercetes manoius Roewer, 1938 – New Guinea
- Pandercetes niger Merian, 1911 – Indonesia (Sulawesi)
- Pandercetes nigrogularis (Simon, 1897) – Indonesia (Java)
- Pandercetes ochreus Hogg, 1922 – Vietnam
- Pandercetes palliventris Strand, 1911 – New Guinea
- Pandercetes peronianus (Walckenaer, 1837) – New Zealand
- Pandercetes plumipes (Doleschall, 1859) – Sri Lanka, Indonesia (Ambon), New Guinea
- Pandercetes plumosus Pocock, 1899 – Papua New Guinea (New Britain)
