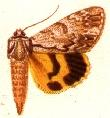

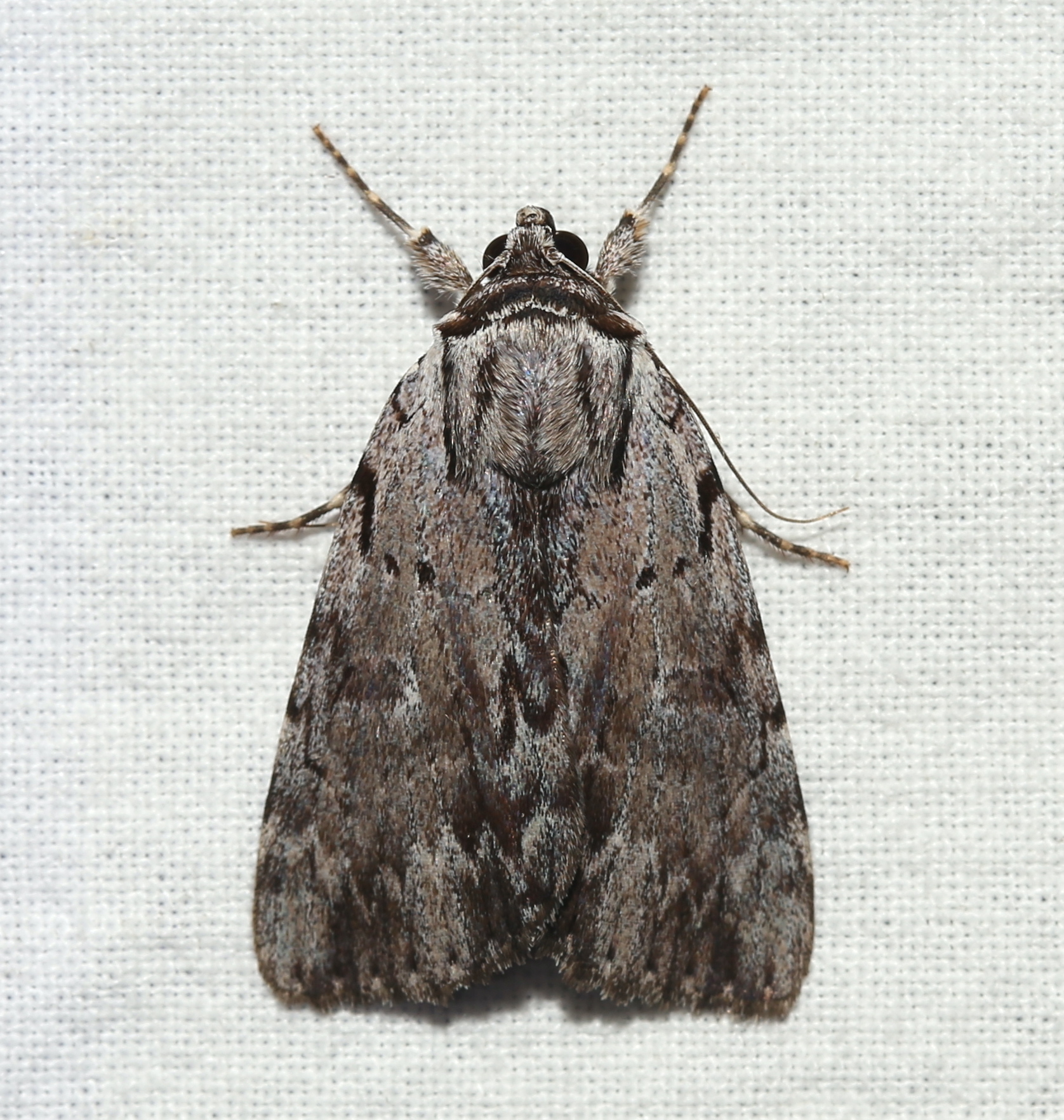

Scientific classification
- Kingdom: Animalia
- Phylum: Arthropoda
- Class: Insecta
- Order: Lepidoptera
- Superfamily: Noctuoidea
- Family: Erebidae
- Genus: Catocala
- Species: C. gracilis

Binomial name
- Catocala gracilis W. H. Edwards, 1864

Synonyms
- Catocala tela Strand, 1914; Catocala cinerea Mayfield, 1922; Catocala lemmeri Mayfield, 1923

= Catocala gracilis =

Graceful underwing

Species of moth

Catocala gracilis, the graceful underwing, is a moth of the family Erebidae. The species was first described by William Henry Edwards in 1864. It is found in North America from Manitoba to Nova Scotia and Maine, south through Connecticut, New Jersey to Florida and west to Mississippi and Missouri.

The wingspan is 40–45 mm. Adults are on wing from July to September depending on the location. There is one generation per year.

The larvae feed on Leucothoe, Vaccinium pallidum and possibly Quercus.
