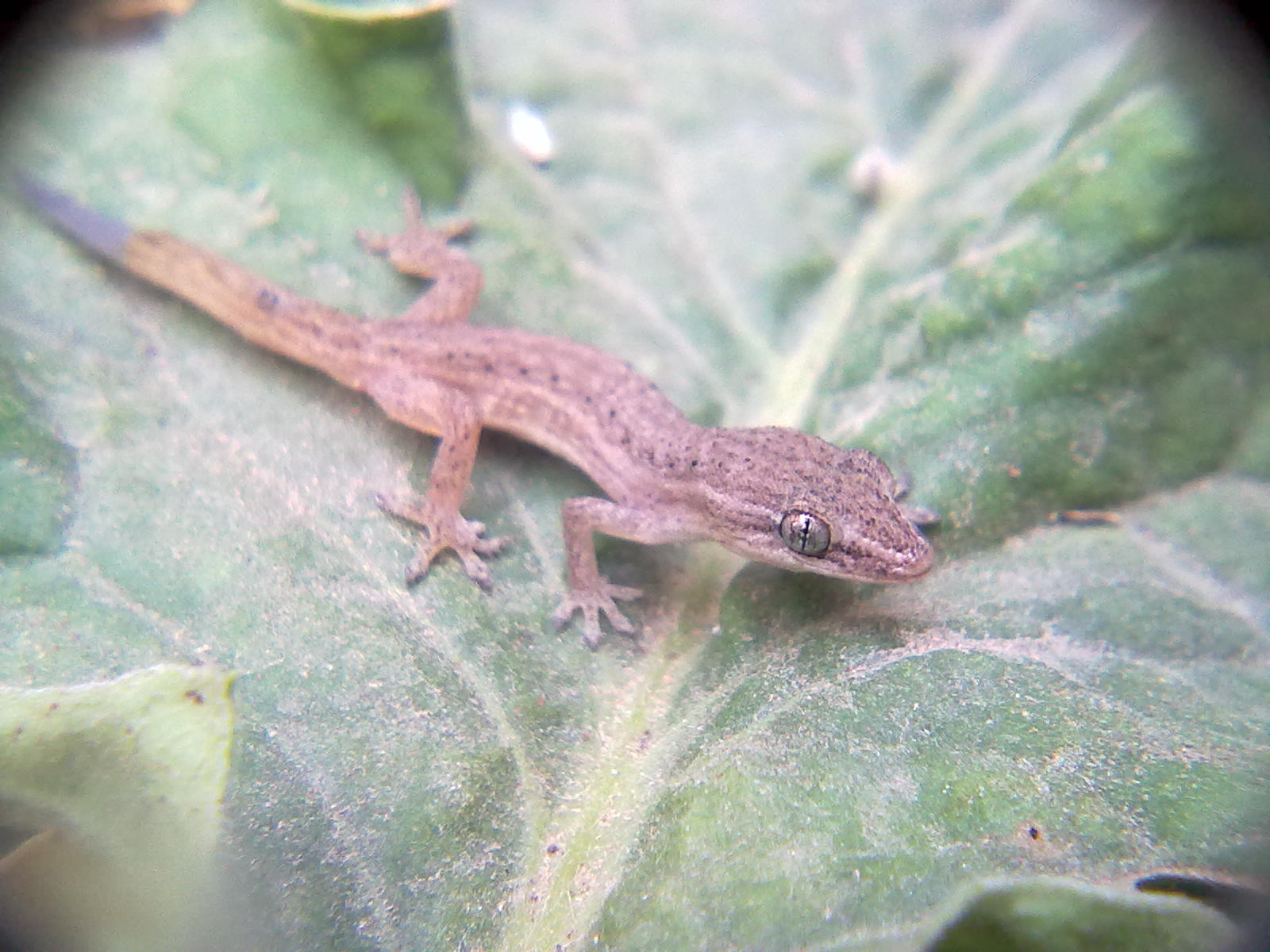

Conservation status
- Least Concern (IUCN 3.1)

Scientific classification
- Kingdom: Animalia
- Phylum: Chordata
- Class: Reptilia
- Order: Squamata
- Suborder: Gekkota
- Family: Gekkonidae
- Genus: Hemidactylus
- Species: H. gracilis

Binomial name
- Hemidactylus gracilis Blanford, 1870

= Graceful leaf-toed gecko =

Graceful Leaf-toed Gecko

Species of lizard

The graceful leaf-toed gecko (Hemidactylus gracilis) is a species of small-sized gecko found in India. The holotype was described in British India in Berar (what is now Amravati).

== Description ==
The head is narrow and elongated, with the snout a little longer than the distance between the eye and the ear-opening. The forehead is not concave, the ear-opening is small and roundish. The body and limbs are slender.

The snout has polygonal rugose scales, the back of the head has small granules.

The body is covered above with coarse granules intermixed with oval, subtrihedral, strongly keeled tubercles arranged in about twelve irregular longitudinal series. Abdominal scales are large.

The tail is round, but slightly depressed at the base and not at all further back, tapering, without any enlarged or spinose tubercles whatever. Grey above, with subquadrangular black spots arranged in longitudinal series. There is a black streak white-edged above on the side of the head, passing through the eye; whitish beneath, with or without longitudinal grey lines.

Type locality: southeastern Berar and Reipur, Central Provinces.
