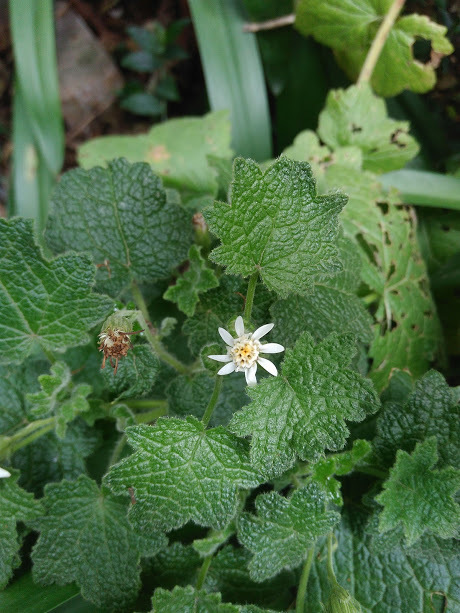

Scientific classification
- Kingdom: Plantae
- Clade: Embryophytes
- Clade: Tracheophytes
- Clade: Spermatophytes
- Clade: Angiosperms
- Clade: Eudicots
- Clade: Asterids
- Order: Asterales
- Family: Asteraceae
- Subfamily: Mutisioideae
- Tribe: Nassauvieae
- Genus: Jungia; L.f. 1781 conserved name, not Heist. ex Fabr. 1759 (Lamiaceae) nor Boehm. 1760 (Acanthaceae) nor Gaertn. 1788 (Myrtaceae) nor Loefl. 1758 (Malvaceae) nor Heist. ex Moench 1794 (Lamiaceae)

Synonyms
- Iungia L.f, alternate spelling; Tostimontia S.Díaz; Dumerilia Lag. ex DC.; Martrasia Lag.; Rhinactina Willd.; Trinacte Gaertn.

= Jungia =

Genus of flowering plants

Jungia is a genus of flowering plants in the family Asteraceae. It is native mostly to South America, with one widespread species extending its range into Central America and southern Mexico.

Species accepted by the Plants of the World Online as of December 2022:

- Jungia axillaris (Lag. ex DC.) Spreng. - Colombia
- Jungia beckii Harling - Bolivia
- Jungia calyculata Cuatrec. - Colombia
- Jungia coarctata Hieron. - Colombia, Ecuador
- Jungia crenatifolia Harling
- Jungia discolor Muschl.
- Jungia ferruginea L.f. - from Chiapas to Bolivia
- Jungia fistulosa Hieron.
- Jungia floribunda Less. - from Peru to Uruguay
- Jungia glandulifera Harling
- Jungia gracilis Harling - Peru
- Jungia gunnerifolia (S.Díaz) Diazgr. & F.Ávila
- Jungia hirsuta Cuatrec.
- Jungia karstenii Sch.Bip. ex Cuatrec. - Colombia
- Jungia mitis Benoist - Ecuador
- Jungia ovata Harling
- Jungia paniculata (DC.) A.Gray - Peru, Ecuador
- Jungia pauciflora Rusby - northwestern Argentina, Bolivia
- Jungia polita Griseb. - Bolivia, northern Chile, northwestern Argentina
- Jungia pringlei Greenm. - Michoacán
- Jungia rugosa Less.
- Jungia schuerae Harling - Peru
- Jungia sellowii Less. - Brazil, Misiones
- Jungia sordida J.Kost. - Bolivia
- Jungia spectabilis D.Don - Peru, Ecuador
- Jungia stuebelii (Hieron.) Crisci - Peru
- Jungia vitocensis Cuatrec.
- Jungia weberbaueri Cerrate - Peru, Ecuador, Bolivia
- Jungia woodii D.J.N.Hind - Bolivia

Formerly included

Several species were at one time included in Jungia but are now regarded as more appropriate in other genera (Acourtia and Pleocarphus).
