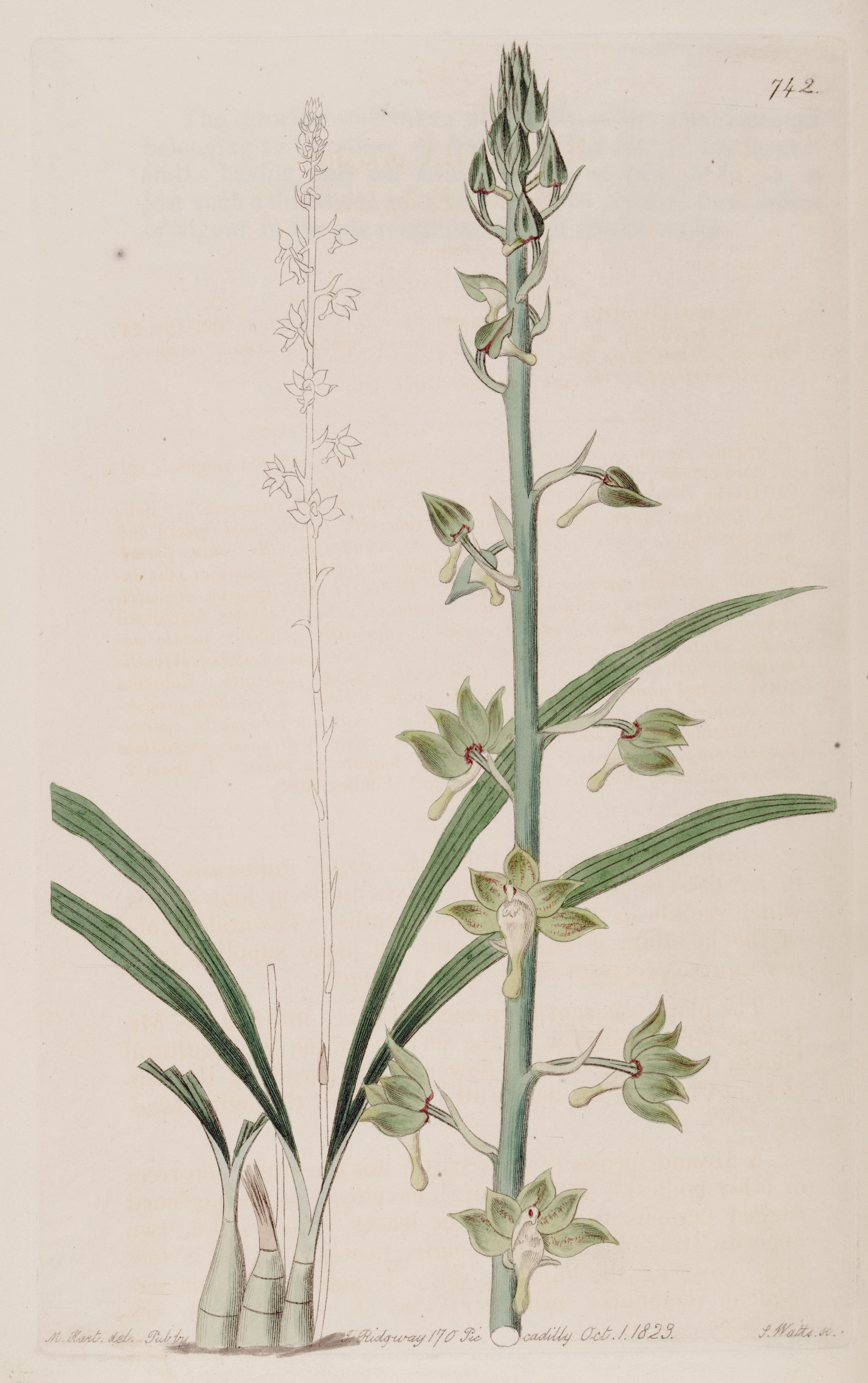

Scientific classification
- Kingdom: Plantae
- Clade: Tracheophytes
- Clade: Angiosperms
- Clade: Monocots
- Order: Asparagales
- Family: Orchidaceae
- Subfamily: Epidendroideae
- Genus: Eulophia
- Species: E. gracilis

Binomial name
- Eulophia gracilis Lindl.

Synonyms
- See text

= Eulophia gracilis =

Species of orchid

Eulophia gracilis is a species of orchid, occurring from West and Central Tropical Africa to Angola.

== Synonyms ==
Selected from Plants of the World Online.

- Galeandra gracilis (Lindl.) Lindl.
- Graphorkis gracilis (Lindl.) Kuntze
- Limodorum ciliatum Schumach.
- Galeandra extinctoria Lindl.
- Eulophia ciliata (Schumach.) Rchb.f.
- Graphorkis ciliata (Schumach.) Kuntze
- Eulophia preussii Kraenzl.
- Eulophia laurentiana Kraenzl.
- Eulophia virens A.Chev.
