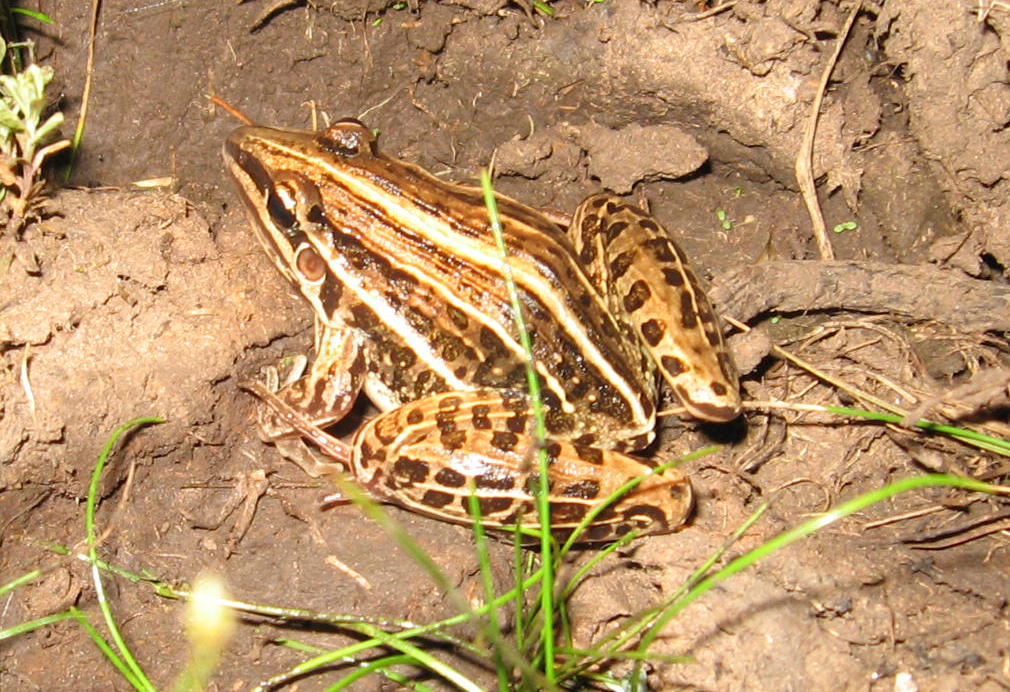

Conservation status
- Least Concern (IUCN 3.1)

Scientific classification
- Kingdom: Animalia
- Phylum: Chordata
- Class: Amphibia
- Order: Anura
- Family: Leptodactylidae
- Genus: Leptodactylus
- Species: L. gracilis

Binomial name
- Leptodactylus gracilis (Duméril & Bibron, 1841)

= Leptodactylus gracilis =

Species of frog

Leptodactylus gracilis is a species of frog in the family Leptodactylidae. It is found in Argentina, Bolivia, Brazil, Paraguay, and Uruguay. It is suspected in Peru.

== Habitat ==
This frog lives in grasslands and forests. Scientists observed the frog between 0 and 2000 meters above sea level.

The frog has been reported in many protected places: Río Pilcomayo National Park, Calilegua National Park, Parque Nacional El Rey, Cerro Verde Área de manejo de hábitats y/o especies, Humedales del Santa Lucia Área Protegida con Recursos Manejados, Parque Universitario Sierra de San Javier, Horco Molle Reserva Universitaria, Reserva de Uso Multiple Escuela Rural Enrique Berduc, Rincón de Santa María Reserva Natural Provincial, Pampa de Achala Reserva Hidrica Provincial, El Bagual Private Reserve, APA da Escarpa Devoniana, APA do Entorno da Costeira, ESEC do Taim, FLONA de Chapeco, PARES de Vila Velha, PARES Itapeva, PARES Serra Furada, PARES Tabuleiro, PARMU das Araucarias, PARMU Morro do Ceu, PARNA da Lagoa do Peixe, PARNA dos Campos Gerais, REBIO do Ibicui Mirim, and REBIO Lami Jose Lutzenberger. Scientists think the frog could also live in Área de Proteção Ambiental Do Banhado Grande.

== Reproduction ==
The female frog makes a foam nest in a burrow to lay her eggs. The tadpoles develop in temporary ponds and flooded grasslands.

== Danger ==
The IUCN classifies this frog as least concern of extinction.

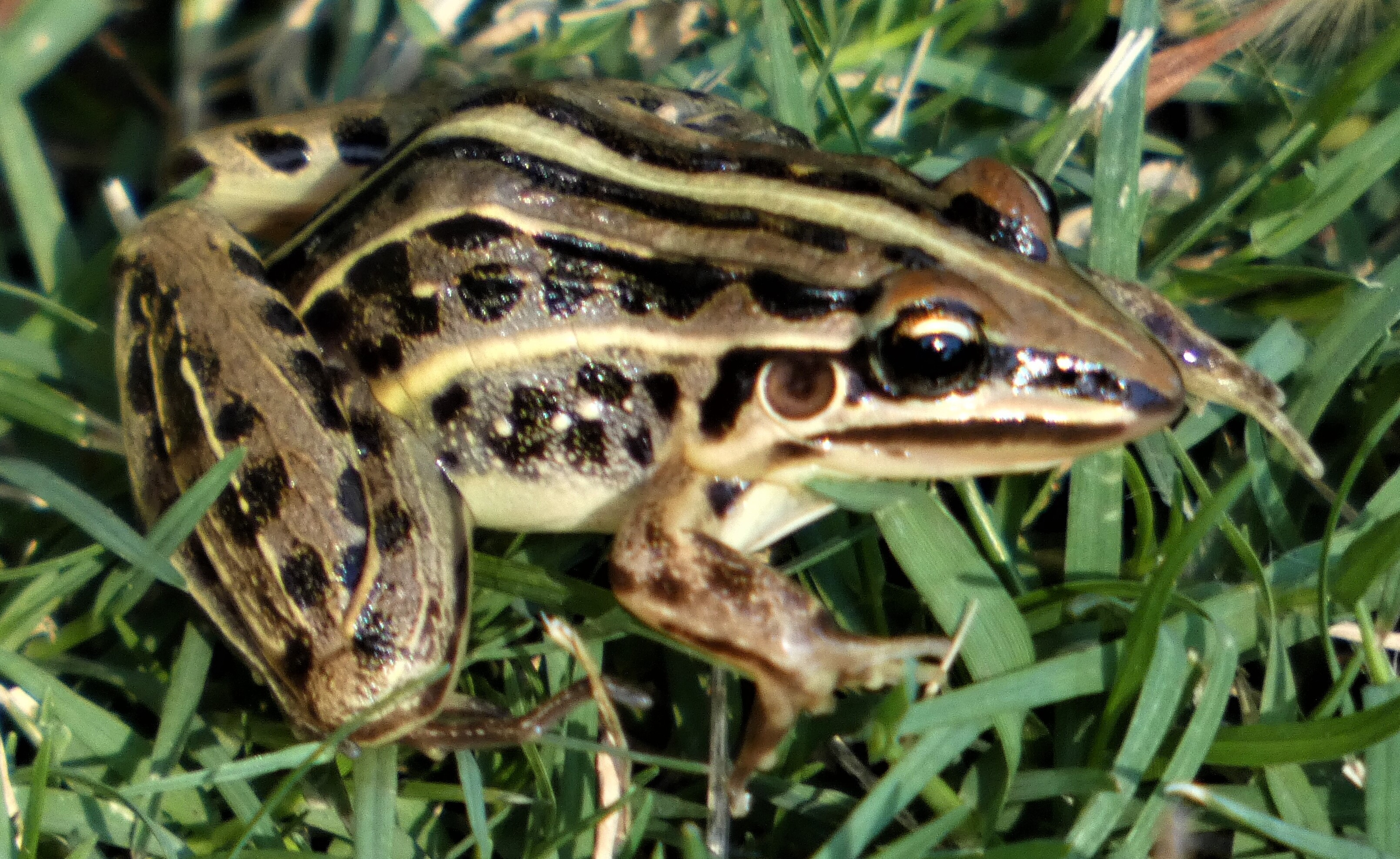
In Uruguay
