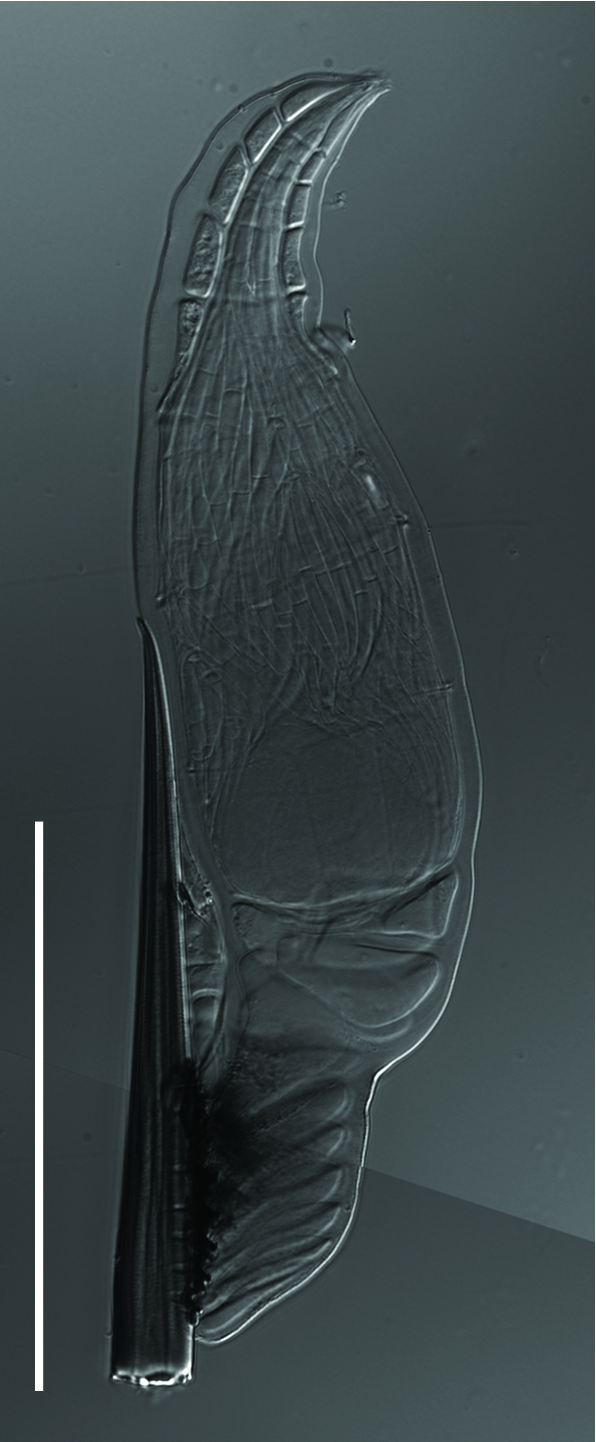
- Female thallus of Herpomyces chaetophilus, removed from a Periplaneta americana cockroach

Scientific classification
- Kingdom: Fungi
- Division: Ascomycota
- Class: Laboulbeniomycetes
- Order: Herpomycetales
- Family: Herpomycetaceae
- Genus: Herpomyces; Thaxt. 1903

Type species
- Herpomyces periplanetae Thaxt. 1903

Species
- H. amazonicus Thaxt. 1931; H. anaplectae Thaxt. 1905; H. appendiculatus Thaxt. 1931; H. arietinus Thaxt. 1902; H. chaetophilus Thaxt. 1902; H. chilensis Thaxt. 1918; H. diplopterae Thaxt. 1902; H. ectobiae Thaxt. 1902; H. forficularis Thaxt. 1902; H. gracilis Thaxt. 1931; H. grenadinus Thaxt. 1931; H. leurolestis Thaxt. 1931; H. lobopterae Thaxt. 1931; H. macropus Speg. 1917; H. nyctoborae Thaxt. 1905; H. panchlorae Thaxt. 1931; H. panesthiae Thaxt. 1915; H. paranensis Thaxt. 1902; H. periplanetae Thaxt. 1902; H. phyllodromiae Thaxt. 1905; H. platyzosteriae Thaxt. 1905; H. shelfordellae Pfliegler & Haelew. 2019; H. spegazzinii A.C. Gut & Haelew. 2020; H. stylopygae Speg. 1917; H. supellae Thaxt. 1931; H. tricuspidatus Thaxt. 1902; H. zanzibarinus Thaxt. 1902

= Herpomyces =

Genus of fungi

Herpomyces is a fungal genus in the order Herpomycetales (Laboulbeniomycetes), with species that are exclusively ectoparasites of members of the Blattodea order (cockroaches). As of 2020, 27 species of Herpomyces are formally described. Members of Herpomyces have been reported from all continents except Antarctica.

== See also ==
- Laboulbeniomycetes
