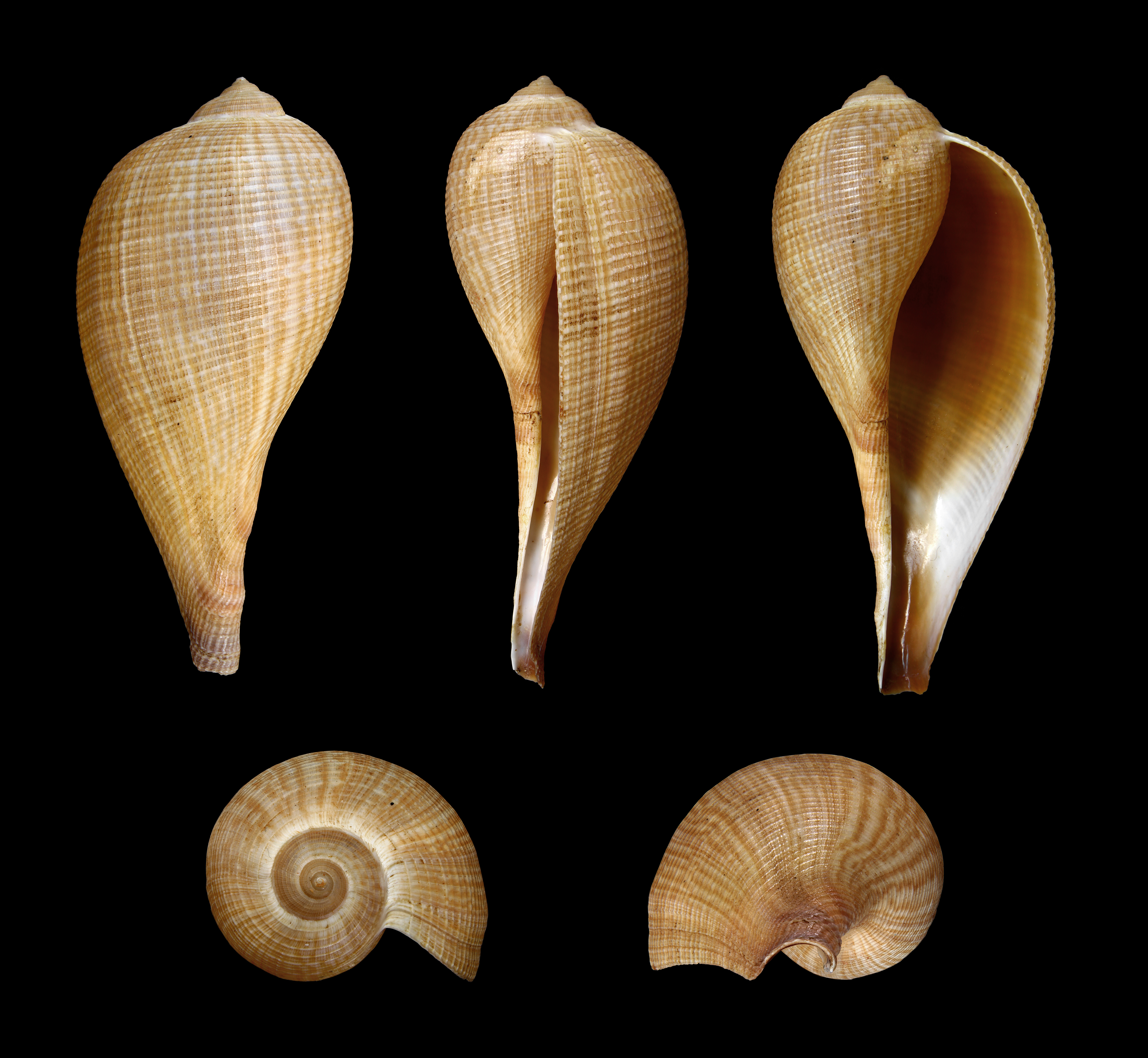
- Five views of a shell of Ficus gracilis

Scientific classification
- Kingdom: Animalia
- Phylum: Mollusca
- Class: Gastropoda
- Subclass: Caenogastropoda
- Order: Littorinimorpha
- Superfamily: Ficoidea
- Family: Ficidae
- Genus: Ficus
- Species: F. gracilis

Binomial name
- Ficus gracilis (Sowerby G. B. I, 1825)

Synonyms
- Pyrula dussumieri Kiener, 1840; Pyrula gracilis G. B. Sowerby I, 1825 (original combination)

= Ficus gracilis =

Species of gastropod

Ficus gracilis is a species of sea snail, a marine gastropod mollusk in the family Ficidae, the fig shells.

== Description ==
A thin-shelled species, attaining a size of 95-100 mm.

== Distribution ==
Pacific Ocean, Taiwan.
