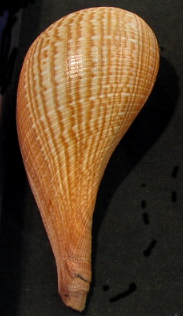
- The shell of Ficus gracilis

Scientific classification
- Kingdom: Animalia
- Phylum: Mollusca
- Class: Gastropoda
- Subclass: Caenogastropoda
- Order: Littorinimorpha
- Superfamily: Ficoidea; Meek, 1864 (1840)
- Family: Ficidae; Meek, 1864 (1840)

Synonyms
- Pyrullinae Swainson, 1840; Sycotypidae Gray, 1853; Ficulidae Carpenter, 1857; Thalassocyonidae F. Riedel, 1895.

= Ficidae =

Family of gastropods

Ficidae, common name the fig shells, are a family of medium to large marine gastropods. It is the only family in the superfamily Ficoidea.

According to taxonomy of the Gastropoda by Bouchet & Rocroi (2005) the family Ficidae has no subfamilies.

The shells of these snails are shaped rather like figs or pears, hence the common name.

The Ficidae were previously included in the Tonnaceae (now Tonnoidea) along with the Tonnidae and Cassididae.

== Distribution ==
The family is found worldwide, mostly in tropical and subtropical silt and mud covered neritic zones.

== Shell description ==
The shells of species in the Ficidae are thin but strong. They have a large aperture and a long siphonal canal, but an extremely low spire which does not protrude above the outline of the body whorl.

Fig shells very often have subdued spiral ribbing, and are subtly patterned in shades of very pale brown and beige.

== Genera ==
Genera within the family Ficidae include:

- Ficus Röding, 1798
- † Austroficopsis Stilwell & Zinsmeister, 1992
- † Ficopsis Conrad, 1866
- † Fusoficula
- † Gonysycon
- Thalassocyon Barnard, 1960

Genera brought into synonymy

- Ficula Swainson, 1835 : synonym of Ficus Röding, 1798
- Pirula Montfort, 1810 : synonym of Ficus Röding, 1798
- Pyrula Lamarck, 1799 : synonym of Ficus Röding, 1798
- Sycotypus Gray, 1847 : synonym of Ficus Röding, 1798
