= Cunninghamella binarieae =

Scientific classification
- Domain: Eukaryota
- Kingdom: Fungi
- Division: Mucoromycota
- Class: Mucoromycetes
- Order: Mucorales
- Family: Cunninghamellaceae
- Genus: Cunninghamella
- Species: C. binarieae

Binomial name
- Cunninghamella binarieae R.Y.Zheng (2001)

Species of fungus

Cunninghamella binarieae is a species of fungus in the family Cunninghamellaceae. It was described as new to science by mycologist Ru-Yong Zheng in 2001. It is closely related to Cunninghamella bertholletiae, with which it shares many similar morphological characteristics.
