= Thelma Perry =

American biologist

Thelma Jean Perry
- Born: April 30, 1941; Birmingham, Alabama, U.S.
- Died: February 10, 1998 (aged 56)
- Resting place: Carver Memorial Gardens Cemetery, Birmingham, Alabama, U.S.
- Education: Louisiana College (BS)
- Parents: James Perry (father); Inez Perry (mother)
- Scientific career
- Fields: Mycology
- Workplaces: U.S. Forest Service

Thelma Jean Perry (April 30, 1941 – February 10, 1998) was an American microbiologist and mycologist who worked at the U.S. Forest Service. Her research focused on the study of symbiotic relationships between bark beetles and fungi, particularly those associated with the southern pine beetle (Dendroctonus frontalis) and other forest insects.

== Early life and education ==
Thelma Perry was born on April 30, 1941, in Birmingham, Alabama, to James H. and Inez Perry. She was one of eight children. She attended Holy Family High School in Birmingham. She later attended Xavier University of Louisiana. At age 37, she enrolled in Louisiana Christian University (then known as Louisiana College), a private Baptist college in Pineville, Louisiana, where she completed a Bachelor of Science degree in biology in 1978. Her formal education in mycology included one online course taught by Bryce Kendrick.

== Career at the U.S. Forest Service ==
Perry began working at the U.S. Forest Service's Southern Forest Experiment Station (SFES), Alexandria Forestry Center in Pineville, Louisiana, as a biological laboratory technician prior to completing her biology degree. She was later promoted to the position of "Microbiologist".

Her work involved conducting experiments with bark beetles, isolating fungi, and identifying fungal species associated with these insects. She identified fungi present in beetle habitats, such as tunnels and bark fissures. She was a member of the Mycological Society of America and read scientific literature related to bark beetles and their associated fungi, co-authoring a bibliography on the subject. She attended at least one society meeting in Ottawa in 1987.

Perry also worked with high school students participating in summer programs at the lab. She advocated for increasing diversity in the biological sciences. She wrote a proposal to provide research opportunities for women and minority students, focusing on the use of DNA techniques for studying differences between fungi.

== Research ==
Perry's research concentrated on the fungi associated with scolytid bark beetles, including Dendroctonus species, which are significant pests of conifer forests in North America.

Among her observations, Perry documented that Pyxidiophora kimbroughii produced the fungal forms previously known as Thaxteriola. This finding provided information relevant to understanding the life cycle and origin of the fungal order Laboulbeniales by demonstrating that the Thaxteriola was a conidium-bearing structure derived from Pyxidiophora.

Working with southern pine beetle-infested pine material, Perry observed an Entomocorticium species characterized by distinctive flat-topped sterigmata and accumulations of basidiospores in beetle galleries. Observations of this fungus by Perry occurred several years before the genus Entomocorticium was formally described in Canada in 1987.

In collaboration with her Forest Service colleagues, Perry co-authored publications describing other fungi associated with bark beetles. These included Ceratocystiopsis ranaculosa, an ascospore-producing fungus associated with the southern pine beetle, and Leptographium terebrantis, a fungus associated with the black turpentine beetle found in the roots of declining pines. She also identified fungi such as Pezizella chapmanii or a similar species and Hyalopycnis sp., a pycnidial basidiomycete, in beetle galleries, noting its potential adaptation for dispersal by arthropods. She became recognized for ability to identify these fungi, sometimes recognizing species related to those found in geographically distant regions.

Perry and colleagues investigated the symbiotic relationships between Dendroctonus bark beetles and the mutualistic fungi they transport in specialized structures called mycangia. Their work included characterizing the structure and contents of the southern pine beetle mycangium. They were the first to report a basidiomycete species as a mycangial associate of a bark or ambrosia beetle. They described the mycangium as a bilaterally symmetrical structure on the beetle's pronotum that appeared to maintain distinct fungal symbionts separately. Observations that fungal mycelium grew from the mycangia of dead beetles but not live ones led to hypotheses that beetle-produced secretions might influence the state of the fungal propagules. The apparent exclusion of certain fungal species from the mycangia also suggested potential antimicrobial properties of these secretions. This research contributed to subsequent studies on insect-fungus symbioses.

== Personal life and death ==
During the final fifteen years of her life, Thelma Perry experienced several personal events, including the drowning death of an infant grandchild, the loss of her home to fire, and an injury to a son resulting in paraplegia. She was also ill with cancer for six years before her death.

Thelma Perry died of cancer on February 10, 1998, at the age of 56. She was buried in Carver Memorial Gardens Cemetery in Birmingham, Alabama. She was survived by her parents, seven siblings, two sons, a daughter, and six grandchildren.

== Legacy ==
In 2020, Perry was acknowledged in an article by Meredith Blackwell dedicated to her in Mycologia.

In 2021, a new fungal species, Entomocorticium perryae, was named in her honor by Araújo and colleagues, citing her role in the initial description of Dendroctonus frontalis mycangia and the first report of a basidiomycete from a scolytine mycangium.
