= Hypophysis =

Hypophysis may refer to:

- Pituitary gland, in vertebrates including humans
- Hypophysis in plant embryonic development
