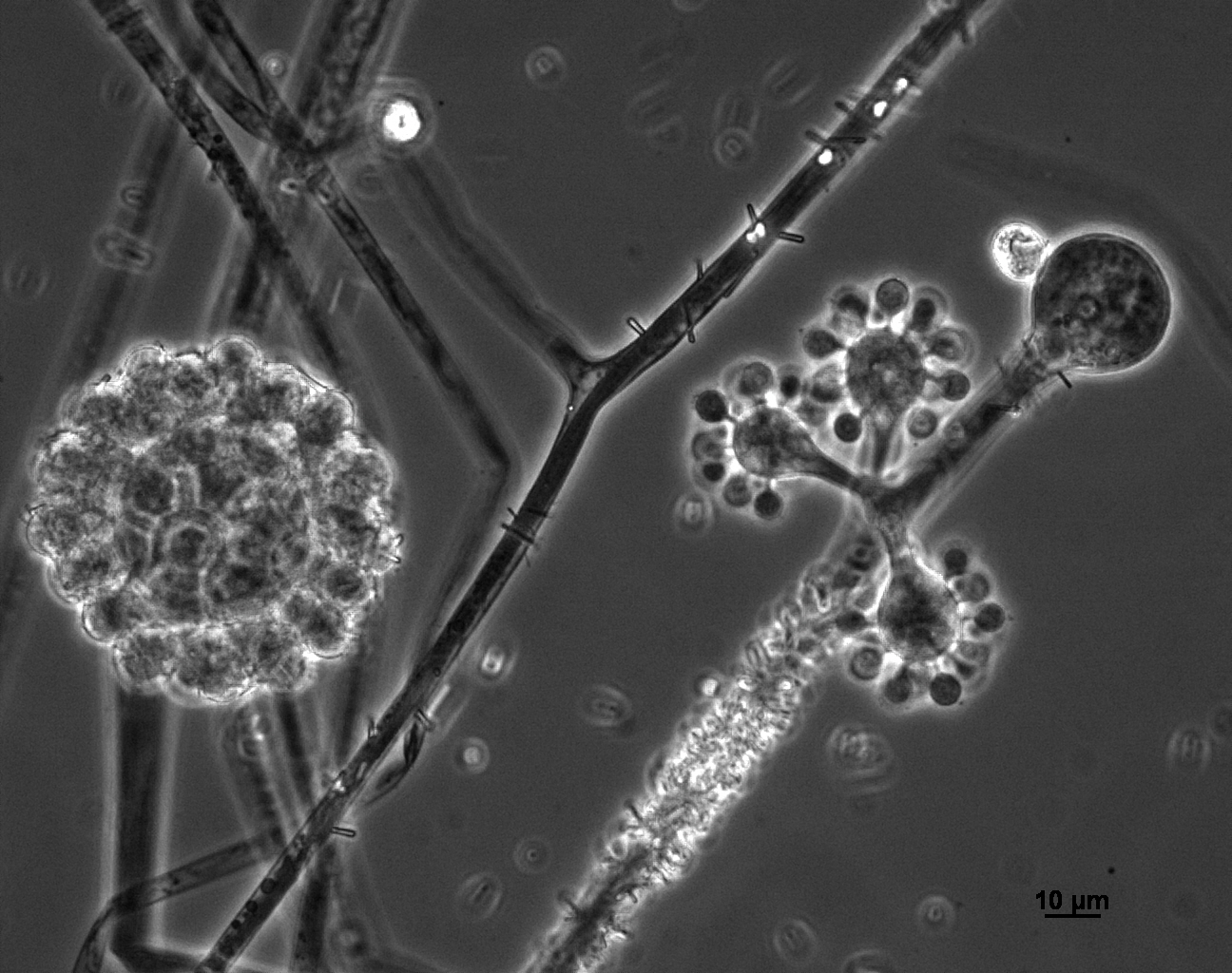

Scientific classification
- Domain: Eukaryota
- Kingdom: Fungi
- Division: Mucoromycota
- Class: Mucoromycetes
- Order: Mucorales
- Family: Cunninghamellaceae
- Genus: Cunninghamella
- Species: C. echinulata

Binomial name
- Cunninghamella echinulata (Thaxt.) Thaxt. ex Blakeslee (1905)

Subspecies
- Cunninghamella echinulata var. antarctica Cunninghamella echinulata var. echinulata Cunninghamella echinulata var. nodosa Cunninghamella echinulata var. verticillata

Synonyms
- Oedocephalum echinulatum Thaxt. (1891); Muratella elegans Bainier & Sartory (1913); Cunninghamella verticillata F.S. Paine (1927); Cunninghamella dalmatica Pispek (1929); Cunninghamella echinata Pispek (1929); Cunninghamella bainieri Naumov (1939)

= Cunninghamella echinulata =

Species of fungus

Cunninghamella echinulata is a fungal species in the genus Cunninghamella. It is an asexually reproducing fungus and a mesophile, preferring intermediate temperature ranges. C. echinulata is a common air contaminant, and is currently of interest to the biotechnology industry due to its ability to synthesize γ-linolenic acid as well as its capacity to bioconcentrate metals. This species is a soil saprotroph that forms rhizoids, preferring soils enriched in nitrogen, phosphorus and potassium. It has been reported occasionally an agent of mucormycosis following the inhalation of fungal spores. Czapek's agar is a suitable growth medium for the propagation of C. echinulata.

== Taxonomy, growth and morphology ==
Cunninghamella echinulata is a member of the family, Cunninghamellaceae (phylum Mucoromycota). This species is closely related to C. elegans, and both species share highly similar characteristics of growth and morphology. Colonies tend to be rapidly growing on most growth media producing a dense, white or greyish aerial mycelium. Cunninghamella echinulata reproduces asexually and solely via yellow-brown, spiny, single-spored sporangioles that, due to the nature of the sporangiospore being retained within the sporangium, appear to have a two-layered outer wall. This fungus grows by means of filaments that lack septa. This is a common feature of members if the Mucoromycota where the hyphal compartments are either fully divided by septa or are completely continuous (coenocytic) and multinucleate. Zygospores of this fungus are only produced following the fusion of gametangia of compatible mating strains, exemplifying a heterothallic mating system. Sporangiophores of this species are irregularly branched and do not resemble the sporangiospores typical of most other members of the Mucoromycota encountered in similar habitats. The sporangioles produced by this fungus are larger in size (10–20 μm) than those of the closely related species, C. elegans.

== Physiology ==
Cunninghamella echinulata and other species of Cunninghamellaceae can be selectively grown on Czapek's solution agar, a property unique to this family of the Mucorales. However, depending on the nutrients the agar is supplemented with, different media can alter the oxidative metabolism profile of this fungus. This species grows better on acetate than d-glucose. Additionally, if grown in liquid, cultures of this fungus can be externally stimulated to increase oxygen consumption by adding 2% montmorillonite or kaolinite.

While this fungus is a mesophilic (preferring intermediate growth temperatures), it is able to grow between 6 °C (43 °F) and 45 °C (113 °F) although the rate of growth near the extremes of temperature tolerance is minimal. The optimal temperature for the development of zygospores is between 25 °C (77 °F) and 35 °C (95 °F). This species exhibits different growth characteristic depending on environmental influences. At a pH of 5.5, the fungus grows in small dense pellets; but a more typical, radiating growth pattern is achieved at a pH of 8.0, The presence of indole-3-acetic acid in the growth medium stimulates linear growth.

When grown on medium containing hydrolysed tomato residue, this fungus utilizes glucose to synthesize triacylglycerols (TAG) rich in GLA. This fungus has been investigated for use in the production of single cell oils (SCO) and storage lipids (like GLA). C. echinulata is also able to selectively take up and sequester metal contaminants from polluted waters, suggesting a potential use in bioremediation of polluted water. However, its role as an agent of opportunistic disease may limit its use in environmental remediation. Cunninghamella echinulata is able to grow on orange rind and assimilate carbohydrates into necessary biomolecules, where the fermented peel does not exhibit appreciable discolouration or odour. Growth of this fungus on organic nitrogen leads yields lipids rich in γ-linolenic acid (GLA). The presence of an active monooxygenase system allows this species to perform oxidative demethylation and hydroxylation. The fungus possesses a p450 cytochrome system similar to that in humans, making it a potentially useful model for the study liver-mediated drug metabolism.

This species is also able to stereoselectively biotransform rac-mexiletine into hydroxymethyl mexiletine (HMM) and p-hydroxymexiletine (PHM), two metabolites also produced in humans. Cunninghamella echinulata grown in yeast extract broth, trypticase soy medium or peptone broth at a pH of 8 yielded 0 μg/ml of breakdown products from the metabolism of rac-mexiletine. The production of maximal HMM is achieved in yeast extract broth at a pH of 7.0. Metabolic activity diminishes with increasing pH up to a maximum pH of 8.0. At increased pH, C. echinulata shows preferential production of S-HMM over R-HMM, the two stereoisomers, specifically enantiomers, of HMM. In order to achieve the highest quantity of GLA, Cunninghamella echinulata grows preferentially on nitrogen-depleted media with a C/N (carbon:nitrogen) molar ratio of 169.

The species has been reported to exhibit antibacterial effects against Staphylococcus aureus and Salmonella typhus, common agents of skin infections and food poisoning respectively. It is also known to inhibit root growth in various grass species in vitro. The fungus is not known to produce mycotoxins.

== Habitat and ecology ==
Cunninghamella echinulata is a saprotrophic resident of the soils in warmer regions of the world, particularly those enriched with NPK fertilizers (Nitrogen, Phosphorus and Potassium). It has been reported from both cultivated and uncultivated soils, including soils from greenhouses and forests in the mediterranean and subtropical zones but is thought to be comparatively rare in temperate zones. Soil depth and pH are not considered to be strongly influential on the growth properties of this fungus in vivo. This species is able to cause rot in foods such as Kola nuts and is a common air contaminant. It can be parasitized by other fungi including species of Piptocephalis, and Trichoderma viride. Additionally, its growth is inhibited in vitro by the fungus, Memnoniella echinata.

== Human disease ==
Disease caused by this fungus and other species of Mucorales is referred to as mucormycosis characterized by a rapidly progressive and destructively invasive disease with relatively low survival. Literature reporting this agent in healthy people is lacking. As a consequence, this species is thought to be exclusively an opportunistic pathogen, affecting individuals with pre-existing health conditions. People with underlying health conditions such as HIV infection and diabetes are at heightened risk for mucormycosis. Infections by C. echinulata are thought to arise from inhalation of fungal spores and are not communicable. Relatively few case reports implicating C. echinulata are available. Of those that are, one prototypical case from 2005 reported a fatal rhinocerebral infection in a 15-year-old boy suffering from acute leukaemia. Biopsy of the infected nasal tissue showed signs of necrosis and vascular invasion.

Cunninghamella echinulata, like other members of the genus, exhibit strong resistance to the antifungal polyene, amphotericin B with a MIC (Minimum Inhibitory Concentration) ranging from 4-16μg/mL that varies according to strain. Strains of C. echinulata also display greater tolerance to itraconazole and posaconazole than other members of the Mucorales. The antifungal agent terbinafine, typically restricted to the treatment of nail and skin infections, shows a relatively low MIC ranging from 0.06 to 0.125 μg/mL.

== Biotechnology ==
It is commonly cultivated for its ability to produce GLA, preferentially synthesizing R-PHM and S-HMM. The fungus is able to synthesize γ-linolenic acid. It also possesses the ability to bioabsorb metals, with the highest levels of bioabsorption reported 5 to 15 minutes after contact with the metals. Adding NaOH to this fungus before it absorbs metals enhances the uptake of Pb, Cu and Zn. These uptake rates also seem to be influenced by pH where at a pH of 7.1, Zn was the most highly absorbed metal, at a pH of 4, Pb was the most highly absorbed metal and at a pH of 5, Cu was the most highly absorbed metal. Cunninghamella echinulata has been used to transform cortexolone to hydrocortisone. Hydroxylation of biphenyl oxide has been studied in C. echinulata.
