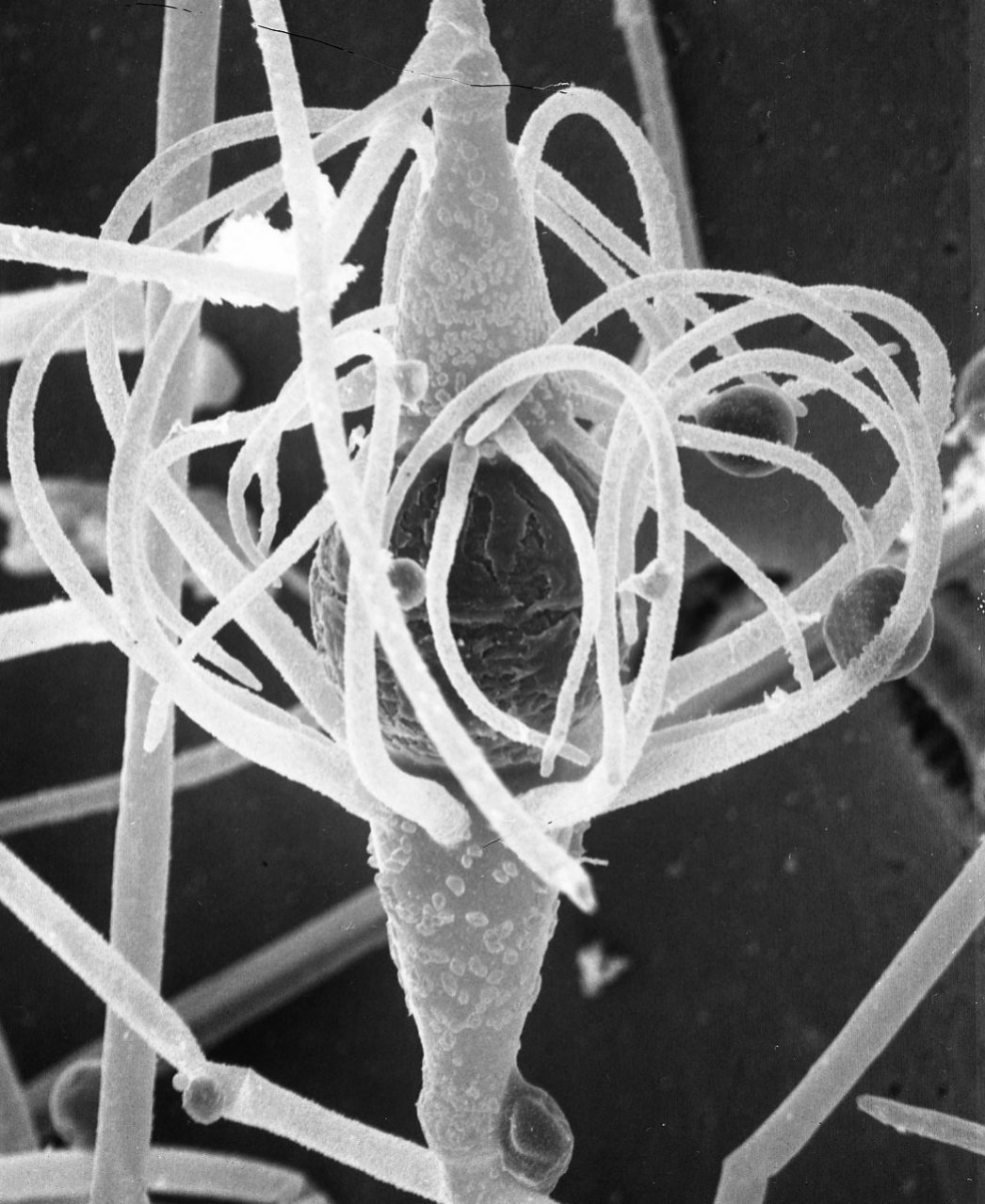

Scientific classification
- Kingdom: Fungi
- Division: Mucoromycota
- Class: Mucoromycetes
- Order: Mucorales
- Family: Cunninghamellaceae
- Genus: Absidia
- Species: A. glauca

Binomial name
- Absidia glauca Hagem, 1908

= Absidia glauca =

Species of fungus

Absidia glauca is a species of fungus belonging to the family Cunninghamellaceae.

It has cosmopolitan distribution.
