= Gliocephalis =

Scientific classification
- Kingdom: Fungi
- Division: Ascomycota
- Class: Laboulbeniomycetes
- Order: Pyxidiophorales
- Family: Pyxidiophoraceae
- Genus: Gliocephalis; Matr. (1899)

Type species
- Gliocephalis hyalina Matr. (1899)

Species
- G. hyalina G. pulchella

Genus of fungi

Gliocephalis is a genus of anamorphic fungi in the family Pyxidiophoraceae. The genus was circumscribed by French mycologist Louis Matruchot in 1899 with G. hyalina as the type and sole species. G. pulchella was transferred to the genus (from Gliocladium) in 1979.
