= Cunninghamella blakesleeana =

Scientific classification
- Domain: Eukaryota
- Kingdom: Fungi
- Division: Mucoromycota
- Class: Mucoromycetes
- Order: Mucorales
- Family: Cunninghamellaceae
- Genus: Cunninghamella
- Species: C. blakesleeana

Binomial name
- Cunninghamella blakesleeana Lendn. 1927

Species of fungus

Cunninghamella blakesleeana is a fungus species in the genus Cunninghamella.

== Biotechnology use ==
Microbiological oxidation of steroids has been studied using Cunninghamella blakesleeana H-334.

Cunninghamella blakesleeana has been used to transform cortexolone to hydrocortisone.
