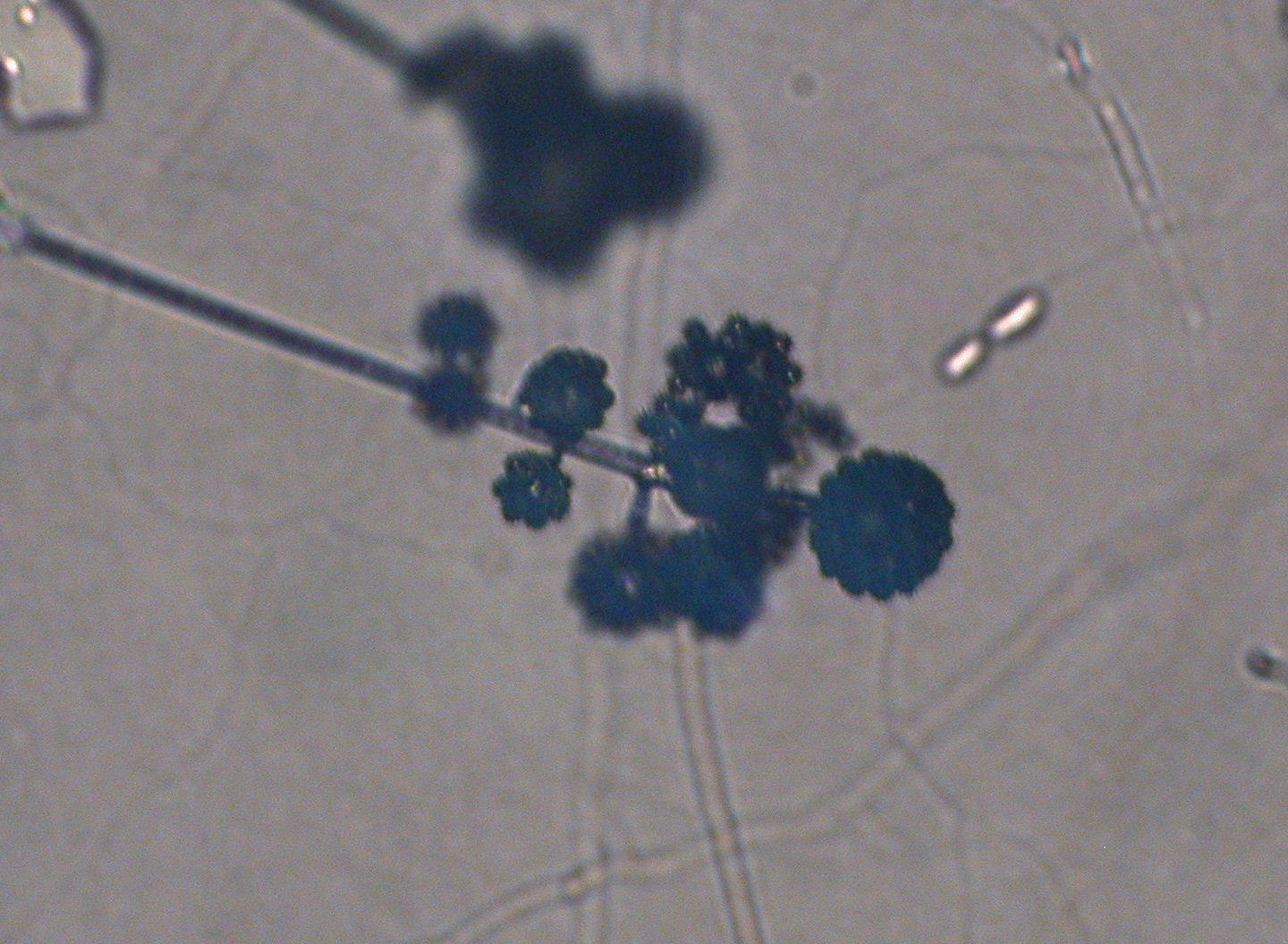
- Cunninghamella echinulata

Scientific classification
- Kingdom: Fungi
- Division: Mucoromycota
- Class: Mucoromycetes
- Order: Mucorales
- Family: Cunninghamellaceae
- Genus: Cunninghamella; Matr. (1903)

Type species
- Cunninghamella africana Matr. 1903

Species
- See text

Synonyms
- Actinocephalum Saito (1905); Muratella Bainier & Sartory (1913); Saitomyces Ricker (1906)

= Cunninghamella =

Genus of fungi

Cunninghamella is a genus of fungi in the order Mucorales, and the family Cunninghamellaceae. The genus was circumscribed by French mycologist Alphonse Louis Paul Matruchot in Ann. Mycol. Vol.1 on page 47 in 1903.

The genus name of Cunninghamella is in honour of David Douglas Cunningham (1843–1914), who was a Scottish doctor and researcher who worked extensively in India on various aspects of public health and medicine.

== Species ==
As of 2015, Index Fungorum lists 13 valid species of Cunninghamella:

- Cunninghamella bertholletiae
- Cunninghamella binarieae R.Y.Zheng 2001
- Cunninghamella blakesleeana
- Cunninghamella candida Yosh.Yamam. 1929
- Cunninghamella clavata R.Y.Zheng & G.Q.Chen 1998
- Cunninghamella echinulata (Thaxt.) Thaxt. ex Blakeslee 1905
- Cunninghamella elegans Lendn. 1905
- Cunninghamella homothallica Komin. & Tubaki 1952
- Cunninghamella intermedia K.B.Deshp. & Mantri 1966
- Cunninghamella multiverticillata R.Y.Zheng & G.Q. Chen 2001
- Cunninghamella phaeospora Boedijn 1959
- Cunninghamella polymorpha Pišpek 1929
- Cunninghamella septata R.Y.Zheng 2001
- Cunninghamella vesiculosa P.C.Misra 1966

== Uses ==
Members of this genus are often used in studies investigating the metabolism of drugs, because these species metabolize a wide range of drugs in manners similar to mammalian enzyme systems. Many species are also capable of oxidizing polycyclic aromatic hydrocarbons, a class of stable organic molecules that tends to persist in the environment and contains many known carcinogenic and mutagenic compounds.

The presence of a cytochrome P450 has been demonstrated in C. bainieri.
