= Cunninghamella septata =

Scientific classification
- Domain: Eukaryota
- Kingdom: Fungi
- Division: Mucoromycota
- Class: Mucoromycetes
- Order: Mucorales
- Family: Cunninghamellaceae
- Genus: Cunninghamella
- Species: C. septata

Binomial name
- Cunninghamella septata R.Y.Zheng (2001)

Species of fungus

Cunninghamella septata is a species of fungus in the family Cunninghamellaceae. It was described as new to science by mycologist Ru-Yong Zheng in 2001. Colonies of C. septata are low and flat, not greater than 1 mm high. Growth of the fungus is slow at 28 °C (82 °F), taking 14 days to reach a diameter of 9 cm (3.5 in) when grown on standard methods agar. The maximum growth temperature is 35 °C (95 °F). The specific epithet refers to septa, which are present and common in all parts of the fungus.
