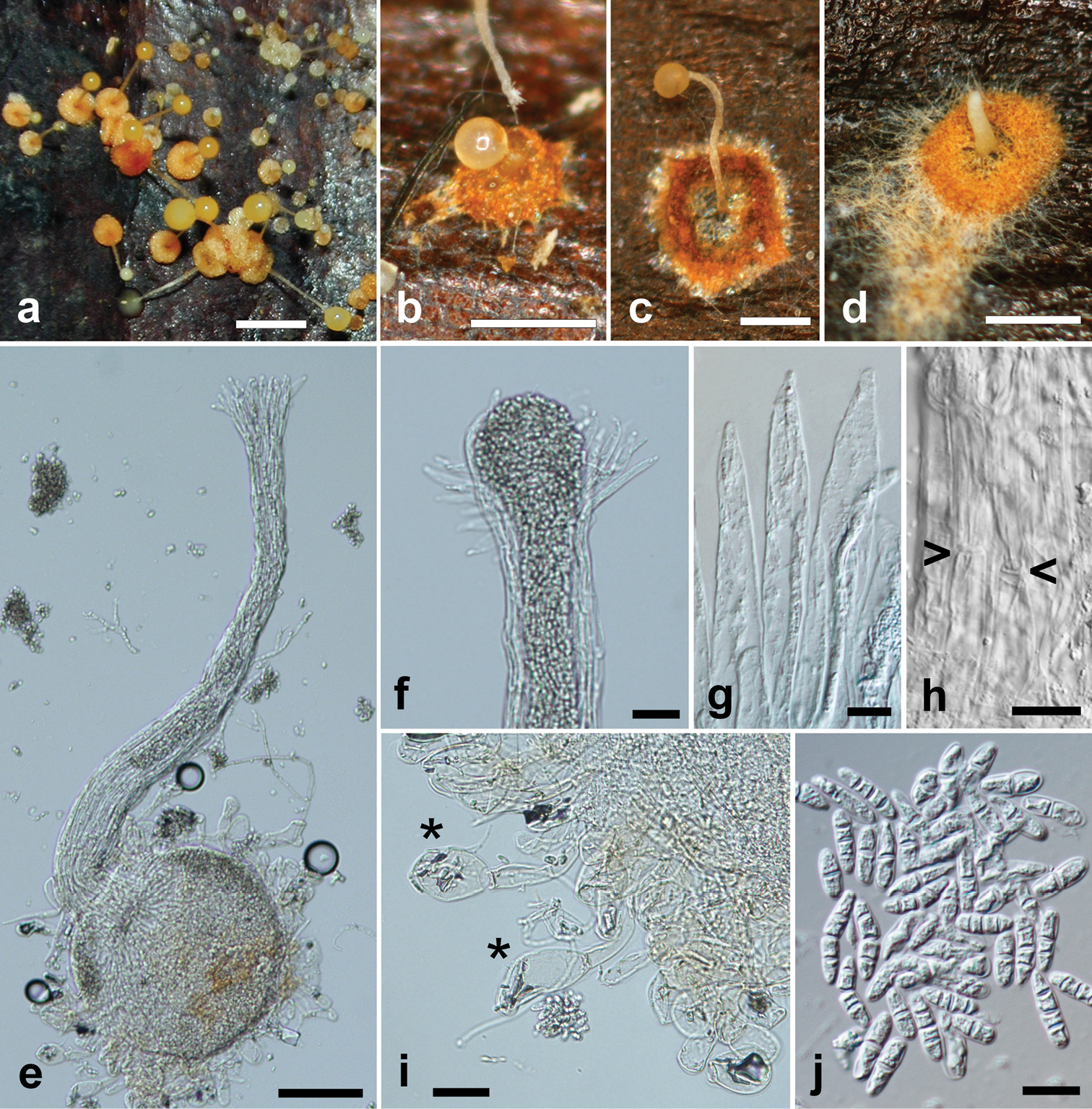
- Pycnopulvinus aurantiacus showing basidiocarps and microscopic details

Scientific classification
- Kingdom: Fungi
- Division: Basidiomycota
- Class: Microbotryomycetes
- Order: Heterogastridiales; Oberw. & R.Bauer (1990)
- Family: Heterogastridiaceae; Oberw. & R.Bauer (1990)

Genera
- Atractocolax; Hyalopycnis; Krieglsteinera; Pycnopulvinus; Slooffia

Synonyms
- Krieglsteineraceae Pouzar (1987)

= Heterogastridiales =

Order of fungi

The Heterogastridiales are an order of fungi in the class Microbotryomycetes. The order contains a single family, the Heterogastridiaceae, which currently contains five genera. Some species in the order are currently known only from their yeast states. Those producing hyphal states have auricularioid (laterally septate) basidia and are parasitic on other fungi. Basidiocarps (fruit bodies), when present, are minute and variously stilboid (pin-shaped), pustular, or pycnidioid (flask-shaped). Molecular research, based on cladistic analysis of DNA sequences, has shown that the order is a monophyletic (natural) group, though the type and only species of Krieglsteinera has not yet been sequenced and may belong elsewhere.
