= Slooffia =

Scientific classification
- Kingdom: Fungi
- Division: Basidiomycota
- Class: Microbotryomycetes
- Order: Heterogastridiales
- Family: Heterogastridiaceae
- Genus: Slooffia; Q.M. Wang, F.Y. Bai, M. Groenew. & Boekhout (2015)

Type species
- Slooffia tsugae (Phaff & Carmo Souza) Q.M. Wang, F.Y. Bai, M. Groenew. & Boekhout (2015)

Species
- Slooffia cresolica Slooffia globosa Slooffia micra Slooffia pilatii Slooffia tsugae Slooffia velesii

Genus of fungi

Slooffia is a genus of fungi in the subdivision Pucciniomycotina. Most species are known only from their yeast states. Known hyphal states produce auricularioid (tubular and laterally septate) basidia, bearing basidiospores, and are parasitic on other fungi.
