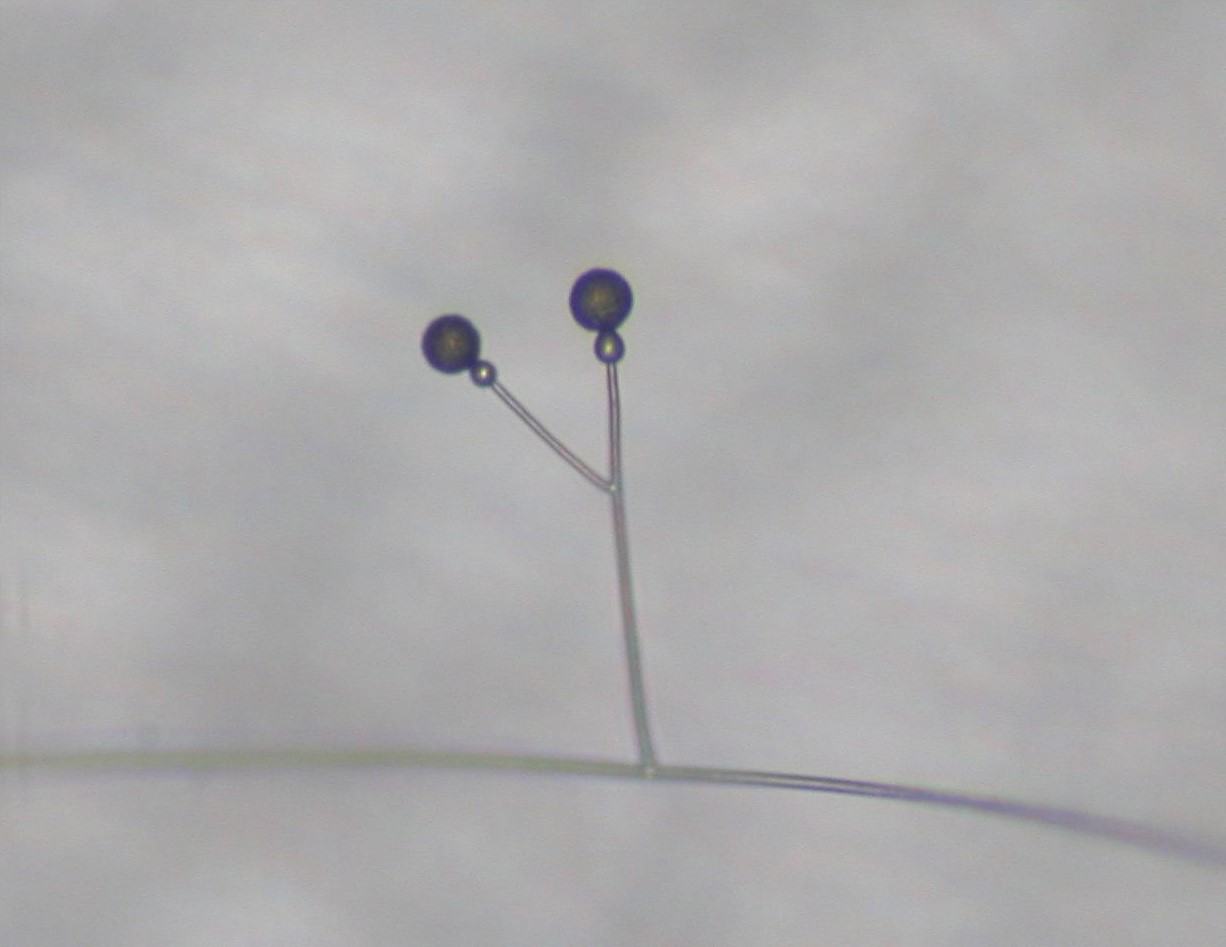
- Gongronella butleri

Scientific classification
- Kingdom: Fungi
- Division: Mucoromycota
- Class: Mucoromycetes
- Order: Mucorales
- Family: Cunninghamellaceae
- Genus: Gongronella; Ribaldi

= Gongronella =

Genus of fungi

Gongronella is a genus of fungi belonging to the family Cunninghamellaceae.

The genus has cosmopolitan distribution.

== Species ==
Species:

- Gongronella brasiliensis C.A.F.de Souza, D.X.Lima & A.L.Santiago
- Gongronella butleri (Lendn.) Peyronel & Dal Vesco
- Gongronella guangdongensis F.Liu, T.T.Liu & L.Cai
