= Suspensor =

Temporary anatomical structure in plants and fungi

In the angiosperm zygote, the filamentous suspensor is indicated by (II)(4).

A suspensor is a temporary anatomical structure in fungi and plants that supports early development. In fungi, it holds the zygospore between hyphae. In plants, it connects the embryo to surrounding tissues and helps position it within the endosperm. The plant suspensor actively transports nutrients and growth hormones from the surrounding seed tissues to the developing embryo, functioning much like an umbilical cord in mammals. Once the embryo is properly established and positioned, the suspensor destroys itself through a controlled process of cell death, having completed its brief but essential role in early plant development.

== Fungi ==
In zygomycete fungi, a suspensor is a short, specialised branch of hypha that props up the developing zygosporangium (the thick-walled, sexual spore case). It forms during the late stage of the zygophore—the structure that initially brings the two compatible hyphae together. In some genera such as Mucor and Rhizopus the two opposing suspensors are similar in thickness, whereas in others, including Zygorhynchus and Absidia (order Mucorales), one suspensor is conspicuously stouter than the other.

== Plants ==
In plants, suspensors are found in zygotes in angiosperms, connecting the endosperm to an embryo. Usually in dicots the suspensor cells divide transversally a few times to form a filamentous suspensor of 6–10 cells. The suspensor helps in pushing the embryo into the endosperm. The first cell of the suspensor towards the micropylar end becomes swollen and functions as a haustorium. The haustorium has wall ingrowths similar to those of a transfer cell.

The last of the suspensors at the end of the embryo is known as hypophysis. Hypophysis later gives rise to the radicle and root cap. During embryo development in angiosperm seeds, normal development involves asymmetrical division of the unicellular embryo, inducing polarity. The smaller terminal cell divides to become the proembryo while the larger basal cell divides laterally to form the suspensor. The suspensor is analogous to a placental mammalian's umbilical cord.

Comparative studies make it clear that the suspensor is more than a passive stalk. Microscopy and physiological experiments show that it physically "pushes" the embryo proper deeper into the endosperm cavity and simultaneously forms a living bridge through which nutrients and growth regulators move from maternal tissues to the embryo. Specialised anatomical features enhance this transport capacity: many suspensors bear extensive cell wall ingrowths that amplify membrane surface area, haustorial outgrowths that penetrate adjacent tissue, and dense fields of plasmodesmata for symplastic flow.

In most dicot embryos the basal (micropylar) suspensor cell becomes exceptionally large. This swollen cell functions as a haustorium, acting as the main interface with surrounding seed tissues and showing the highest metabolic activity within the suspensor. Its transfer-cell-like wall ingrowths, together with the haustorial projections noted above, account for the long-recognised observation that the suspensor actively imports rather than merely suspends the developing embryo.

More recent research shows that the suspensor acts as the embryo's first support organ: it helps establish the embryo's head-to-root axis, funnels sugars and other nutrients from surrounding tissues, makes its own growth hormones (high levels of auxin and gibberellins have been detected), and then dismantles itself through a tightly regulated burst of programmed cell death once its brief task is complete.
