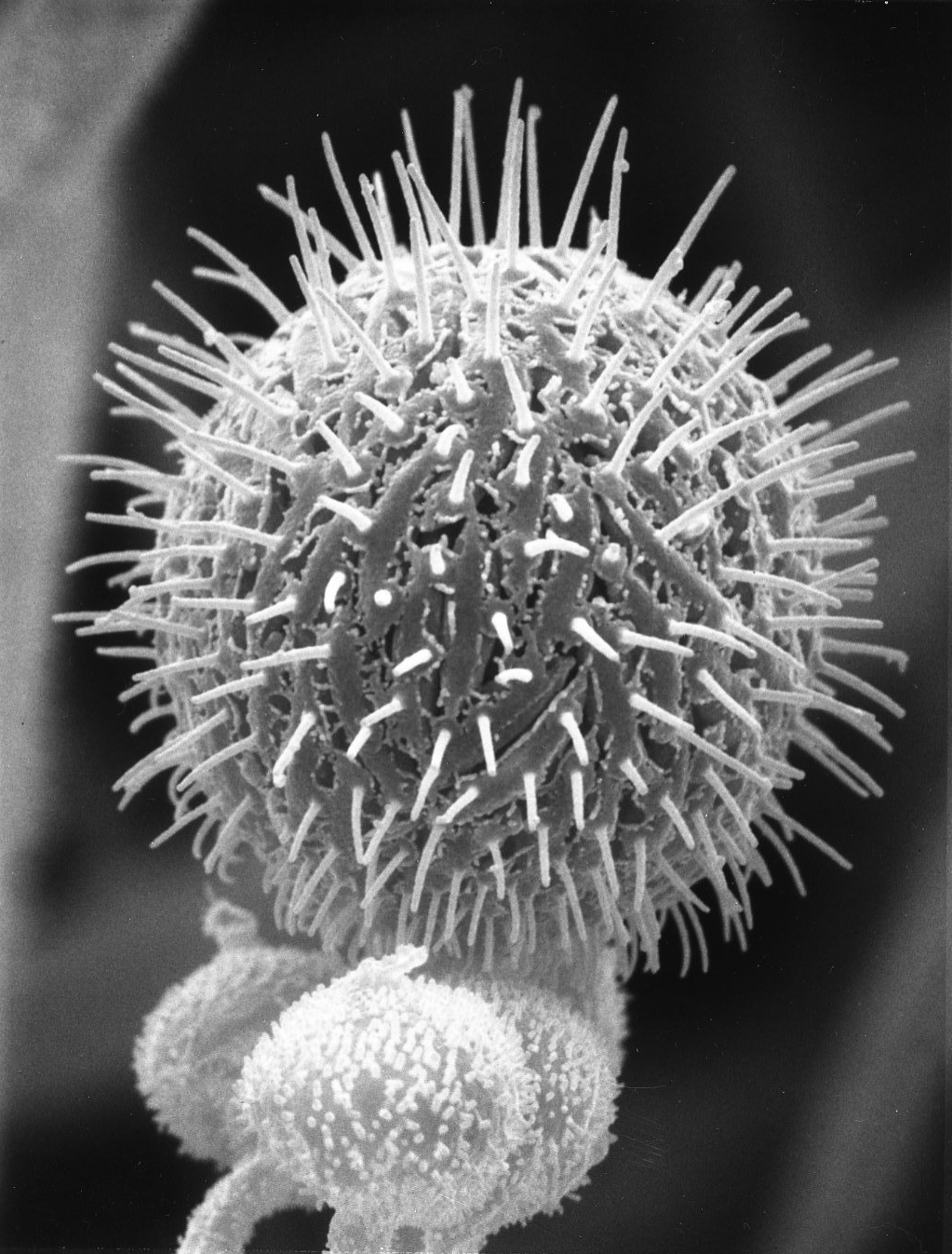
- Hesseltinella vesiculosa

Scientific classification
- Kingdom: Fungi
- Division: Mucoromycota
- Class: Mucoromycetes
- Order: Mucorales
- Family: Cunninghamellaceae
- Genus: Hesseltinella; H.P.Upadhyay, 1970

= Hesseltinella =

Genus of fungi

Hesseltinella is a genus of fungi belonging to the family Cunninghamellaceae.

The genus name of Hesseltinella is in honour of Clifford William Hesseltine (1917–1999), who was an American botanist (Mycology), Microbiologist, from the University of Wisconsin.

The genus was circumscribed by Harbansh Prasad Upadhyay in Persoonia vol.6 (issue 1) on pages 111, 116-117 in 1970.

The genus has cosmopolitan distribution.

It has one known species; Hesseltinella vesiculosa H.P.Upadhyay
