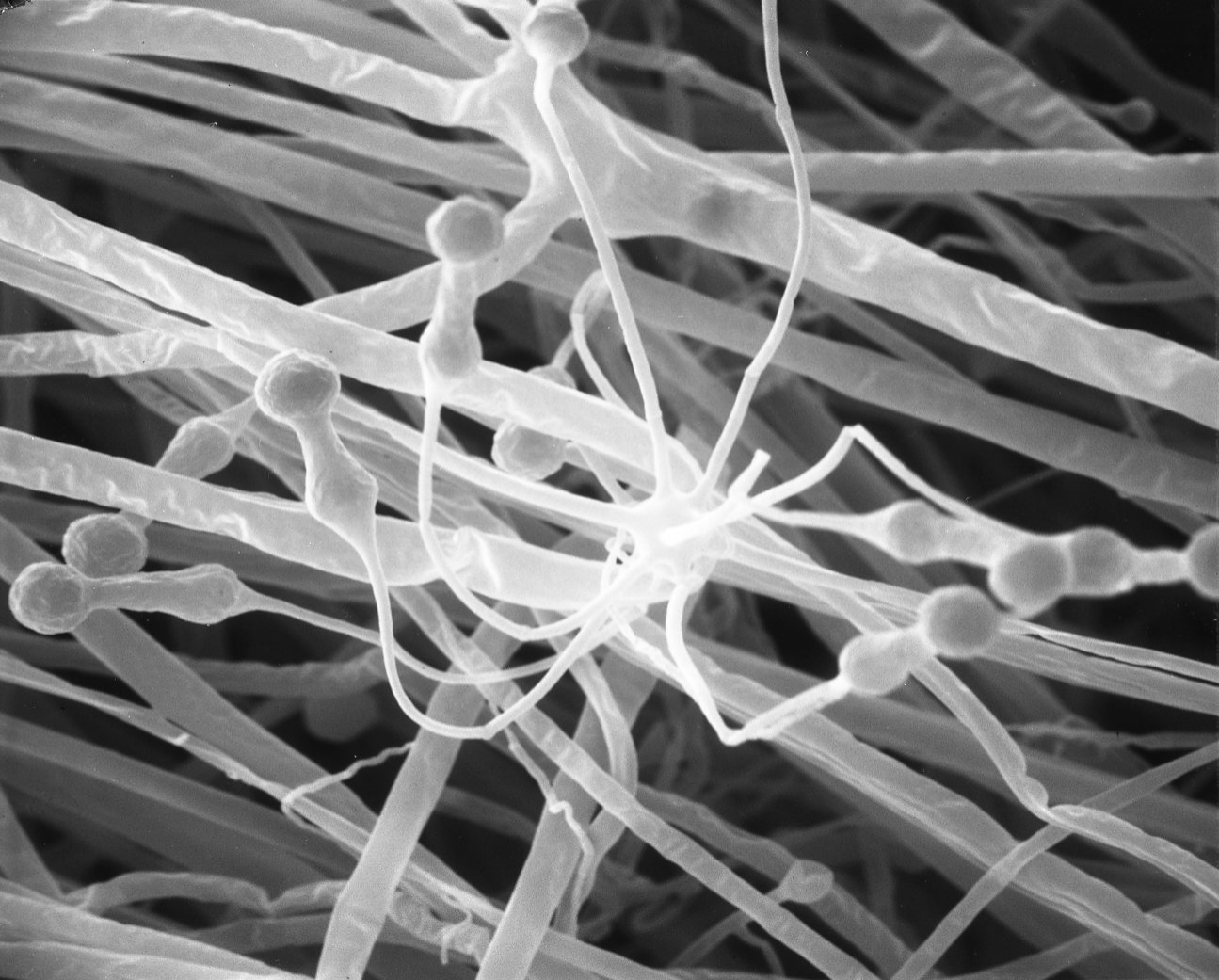
- Halteromyces radiatus

Scientific classification
- Kingdom: Fungi
- Division: Mucoromycota
- Class: Mucoromycetes
- Order: Mucorales
- Family: Cunninghamellaceae
- Genus: Halteromyces; Shipton & Schipper, 1975

= Halteromyces =

Genus of fungi

Halteromyces is a genus of fungi belonging to the family Cunninghamellaceae.

Species:

- Halteromyces radiatus Shipton & Schipper
