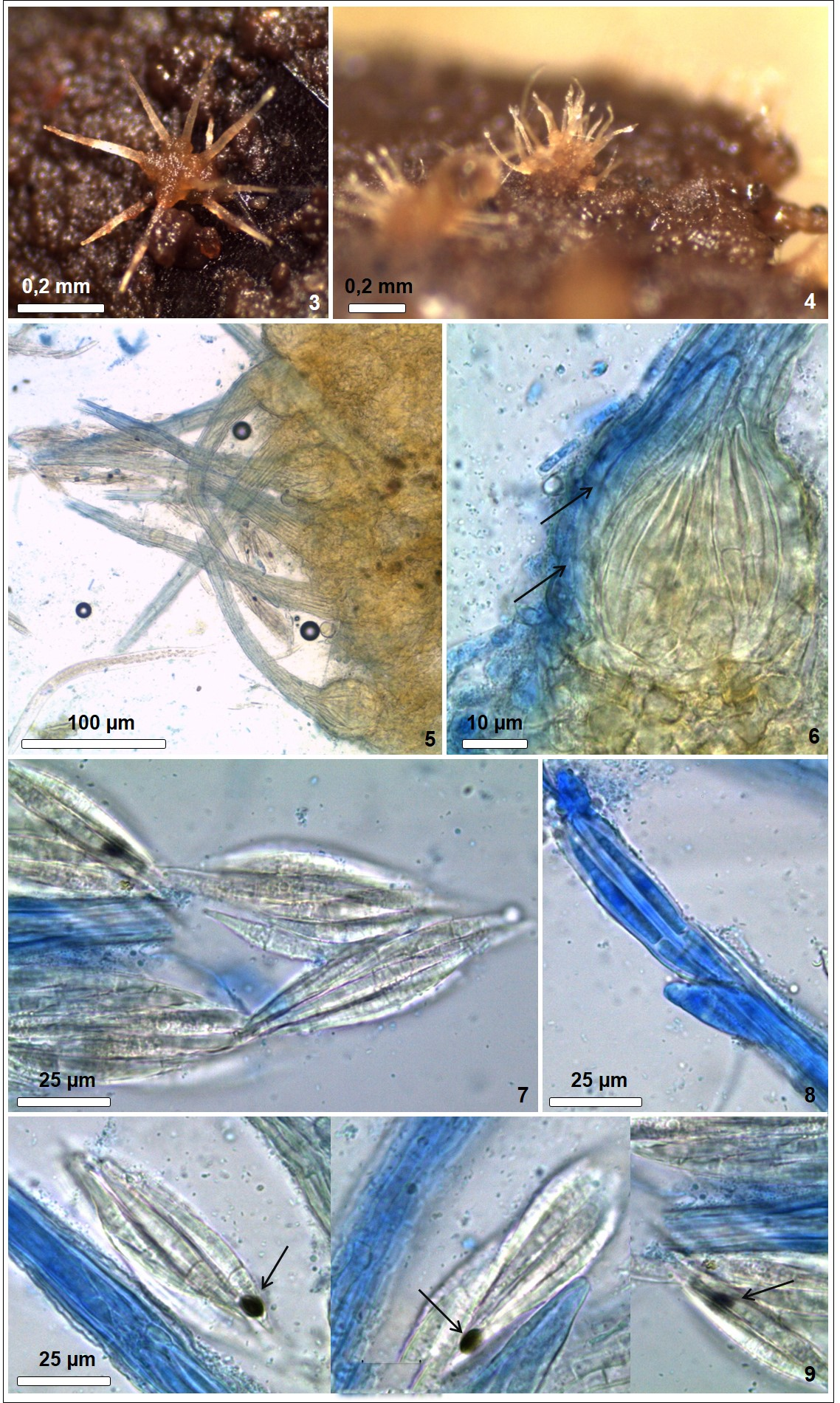
- Pyxidiophora arvernensis. 3–5. Perithecia on dung. 6. A perithecium under optical microscope; arrows point to the exoperidial wall. 7. Ascospores, the arrow points to the acute apex. 8. The ascospore stained with cotton blue. 9. Adhesive discs present in the region near the apex of mature ascospores (arrows)

Scientific classification
- Kingdom: Fungi
- Division: Ascomycota
- Class: Laboulbeniomycetes
- Order: Pyxidiophorales; P.F.Cannon (2001)
- Family: Pyxidiophoraceae; G.R.W.Arnold (1971)

Type genus
- Pyxidiophora Bref. & Tavel (1891)

Genera
- Acariniola; Ascolanthanus; Gliocephalis; Mycorhynchidium; Mycorhynchus; Pleurocatena; Pyxidiophora; Rhynchonectria; Thaxteriola

= Pyxidiophoraceae =

Order of fungi

The Pyxidiophorales are an order of fungi in the class Laboulbeniomycetes. The order was created in 2001 to contain the single family Pyxidiophoraceae, circumscribed in 1971. The Pyxidiophoraceae are mostly coprophilous fungi that associate with mites and other arthropods. The type genus, Pyxidiophora, the largest genus of the family, has about 20 species.
