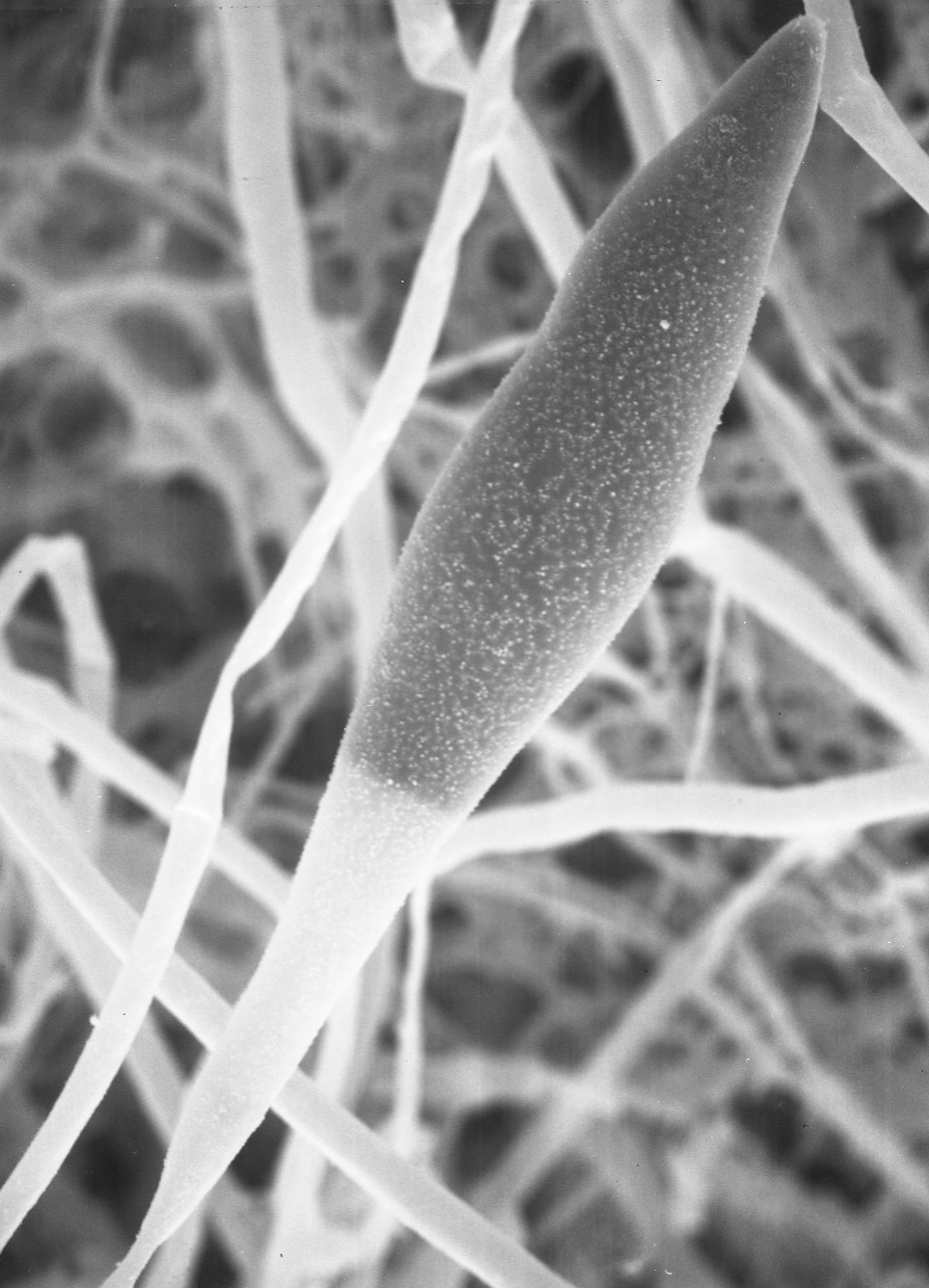
- Chlamydoabsidia padenii

Scientific classification
- Kingdom: Fungi
- Division: Mucoromycota
- Class: Mucoromycetes
- Order: Mucorales
- Family: Cunninghamellaceae
- Genus: Chlamydoabsidia; Hesseltine & J.J.Ellis, 1966

= Chlamydoabsidia =

Genus of fungi

Chlamydoabsidia is a genus of fungi belonging to the family Cunninghamellaceae.

Species:

- Chlamydoabsidia padenii Hesselt. & J.J.Ellis
