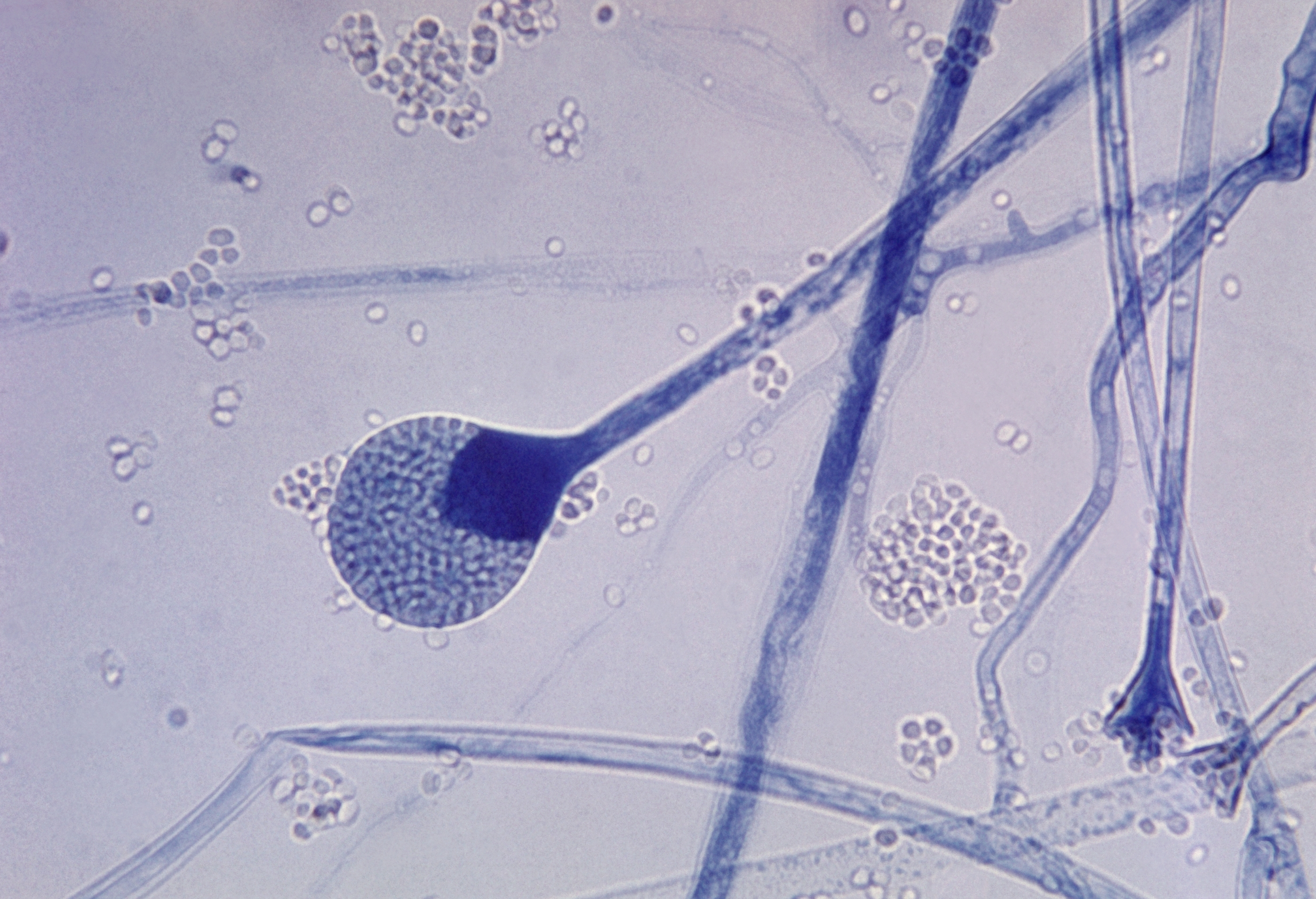
- Mature, blue-stained sporangium of an Absidia mold viewed with a light microscope

Scientific classification
- Domain: Eukaryota
- Kingdom: Fungi
- Division: Mucoromycota
- Class: Mucoromycetes
- Order: Mucorales
- Family: Cunninghamellaceae
- Genus: Absidia; Tiegh. (1878)

Type species
- Absidia reflexa Tiegh.

Species
- See text

= Absidia =

Genus of fungi

Absidia is a genus of fungi in the family Cunninghamellaceae. Absidia species are ubiquitous in most environments where they are often associated with warm decaying plant matter, such as compost heaps. Some species in the genus can cause phycomycosis.

== Taxonomy ==
The genus was first described in 1878 by Philippe Édouard Léon Van Tieghem.

=== Species ===
The genus includes the following species:

- Absidia aegyptiaca
- Absidia anomala
- Absidia atrospora
- Absidia caerulea
- Absidia californica
- Absidia clavata
- Absidia cuneospora
- Absidia cylindrospora
- Absidia dubia
- Absidia fassatiae
- Absidia glauca
- Absidia griseola
- Absidia heterospora
- Absidia idahoensis
- Absidia inflata
- Absidia macrospora
- Absidia narayanai
- Absidia pseudocylindrospora
- Absidia psychrophilia
- Absidia reflexa
- Absidia repens
- Absidia spinosa
- Absidia tuneta
- Absidia ushtrina

=== Synonyms ===
Absidia corymbifera is a synonym for Lichtheimia corymbifera.
