= Plant embryonic development =

Process after the fertilization of an ovule to produce a fully developed plant embryo

Plant embryonic development, also plant embryogenesis, is a process that occurs after the fertilization of an ovule to produce a fully developed plant embryo. This is a pertinent stage in the plant life cycle that is followed by dormancy and germination. The zygote produced after fertilization must undergo various cellular divisions and differentiations to become a mature embryo. An end stage embryo has five major components including the shoot apical meristem, hypocotyl, root meristem, root cap, and cotyledons. Unlike the embryonic development in animals, and specifically in humans, plant embryonic development results in an immature form of the plant, lacking most structures like leaves, stems, and reproductive structures. However, both plants and animals including humans, pass through a phylotypic stage that evolved independently and that causes a developmental constraint limiting morphological diversification.

== Morphogenesis in eudicots ==
Embryogenesis in eudicot angiosperms occurs naturally as a result of single, or double fertilization, of the ovule, giving rise to two distinct structures: the plant embryo and the endosperm which go on to develop into a seed. The zygote undergoes a series of cellular differentiations and divisions to produce a mature embryo. These morphogenic events form the basic cellular pattern necessary for the development of the shoot-root axis and the primary tissue layers. They also initiates the formation of meristematic regions.

Six moments in embryogenesis: 1. Two cell stage; 2. Eight cell stage; 3. Globular stage; 4. Heart stage; 5. Torpedo stage; 6. Maturation; 1. endosperm; 2. single celled zygote; 3. embryo; 4. suspensor; 5. cotyledons; 6. shoot apical meristem (SAM); 7. root apical meristem (RAM)

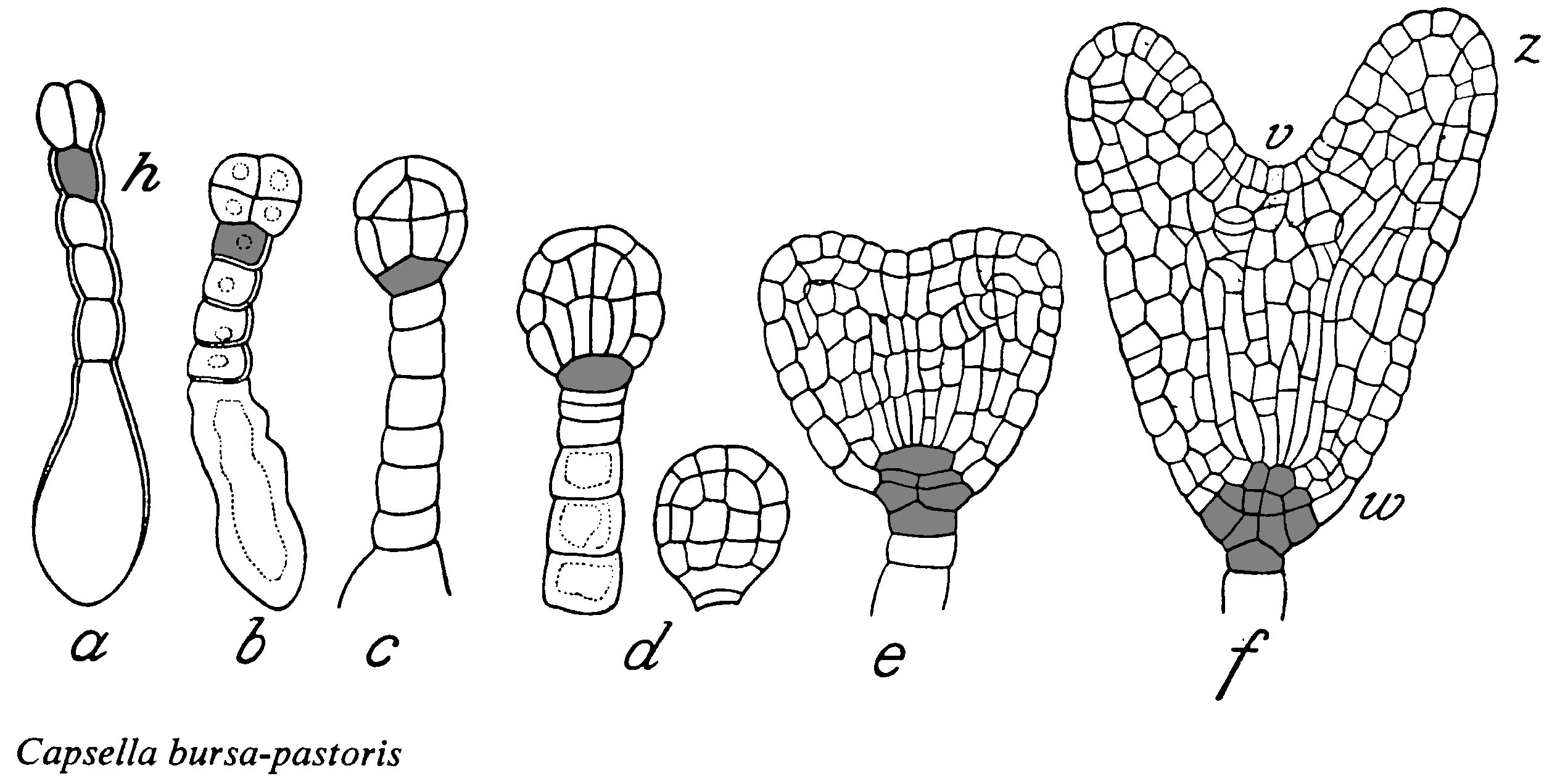
Closer look at the early embryo

=== Plant ===
Following fertilization, the zygote and endosperm are present within the ovule, as shown in stage I of the illustration on this page. The zygote subsequently undergoes an asymmetric transverse cell division, producing to two distinct cells - a small apical cell positioned above a large basal cell. These cells differ in structure and function and give rise to distinct embryonic components thereby establishing polarity in the developing embryo.

apical cell
The apical cell, at the top, retains most of the cytoplasm from the original zygote. It gives rise to the hypocotyl, shoot apical meristem, and cotyledons.
basal cell
The basal cell, below the apical cell, contains a large vacuole and gives rise to the hypophysis and the suspensor.

=== Eight cell stage ===
After two rounds of longitudinal division and one round of transverse division, an eight-celled embryo is formed. Stage II in the illustration above shows the embryo at this eight cell stage. According to Laux et al., four distinct domains are present at this stage. The first two domains contribute to the embryo proper. The apical embryo domain, gives rise to the shoot apical meristem and cotyledons. The second domain, the central embryo domain, gives rise to the hypocotyl, root apical meristem, and parts of the cotyledons. The basal embryo domain form the third domain and contains the hypophysis. Which will later give rise to the radicle and the root cap. The final domain, the suspensor, is located at the base of the embryo and connect it to the endosperm, facilitating nutrient transfer.

=== Sixteen cell stage ===
Additional cell divisions occur, which leads to the sixteen cell stage. The four domains are still present, but they are more defined with the presence of more cells. The important aspect of this stage is the introduction of the protoderm, which is meristematic tissue that will give rise to the epidermis. The protoderm is the outermost layer of cells in the embryo proper.

=== Globular stage ===
The name of this stage is indicative of the embryo's appearance at this point in embryogenesis; it is spherical or globular. Stage III, in the photograph above, depicts what the embryo looks like during the globular stage. 1 is indicating the location of the endosperm. The important component of the globular phase is the introduction of the rest of the primary meristematic tissue. The protoderm was already introduced during the sixteen cell stage. According to Evert and Eichhorn, the ground meristem and procambium are initiated during the globular stage. The ground meristem will go on to form the ground tissue, which includes the pith and cortex. The procambium will eventually form the vascular tissue, which includes the xylem and phloem.

=== Heart stage ===
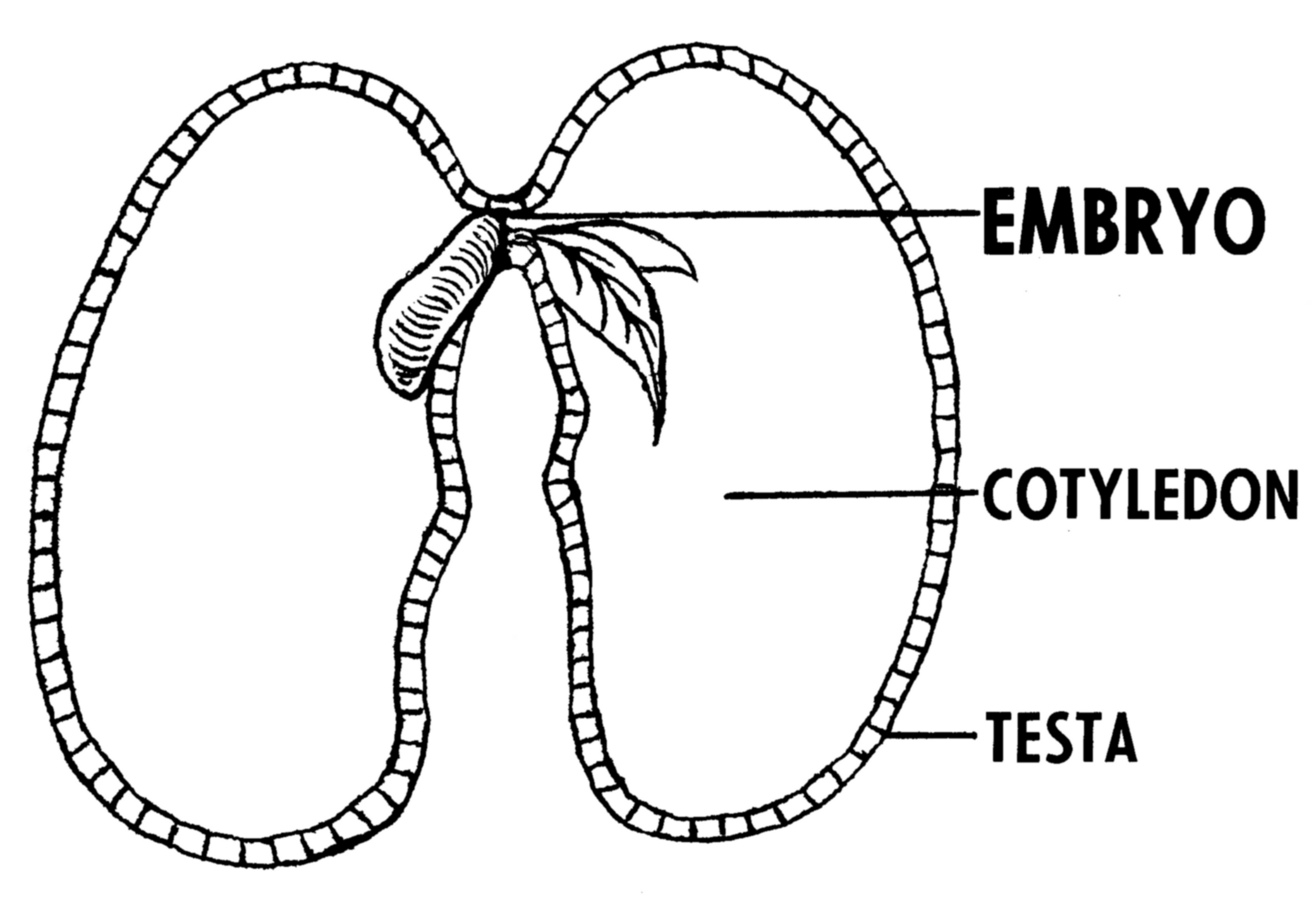
Cotyledon location

According to Evert and Eichhorn, the heart stage is a transition period where the cotyledons finally start to form and elongate. It is given this name in eudicots because most plants from this group have two cotyledons, giving the embryo a heart shaped appearance. The shoot apical meristem is between the cotyledons. Stage IV, in the illustration above, indicates what the embryo looks like at this point in development. 5 indicates the position of the cotyledons. Upon reaching this stage, the symmetry of the embryo shifts from radial to bilateral.

=== Proembryo stage ===
The proembryo stage is defined by the continued growth of the cotyledons and axis elongation. In addition, programmed cell death must occur during this stage. This is carried out throughout the entire growth process, like any other development. However, in the torpedo stage of development, parts of the suspensor complex must be terminated. The suspensor complex, which reaches peak size in the globular stage of cruciferous plants, is shortened because at this point in development most of the nutrition from the endosperm has been utilized, and there must be space for the mature embryo. After the suspensor complex is gone, the embryo is fully developed. Stage V, in the illustration above, indicates what the embryo looks like at this point in development.

=== Maturation ===
The second phase, or post-embryonic development, in higher seed plants, involves the maturation of cells, which involves cell growth and the storage of macromolecules (such as oils, starches and proteins) required as a 'food and energy supply' during germination and seedling growth. These are especially seen in plants that do not store large resources in their endosperm, and are chiefly responsible for the substance of the embryo. Lower forms do not have a discrete distinction between these stages, but transition continuously between embryonic and post-embryonic development. In this stage, the seed coat hardens to help protect the embryo and store available nutrients. The appearance of a mature embryo is seen in Stage VI, in the illustration above.

== Dormancy ==
The end of embryogenesis is defined by an arrested development phase, or stop in growth. This phase usually coincides with a necessary component of growth called dormancy. Dormancy is a period in which a seed cannot germinate, even under optimal environmental conditions, until a specific requirement is met. Breaking dormancy, or finding the specific requirement of the seed, can be rather difficult. For example, a seed coat can be extremely thick. According to Evert and Eichhorn, very thick seed coats must undergo a process called scarification, in order to deteriorate the coating. In other cases, seeds must experience stratification. This process exposes the seed to certain environmental conditions, like cold or smoke, to break dormancy and initiate germination.

== The role of auxin ==
Auxin is a hormone related to the elongation and regulation of plants. It also plays an important role in the establishment polarity with the plant embryo. Research has shown that the hypocotyl from both gymnosperms and angiosperms show auxin transport to the root end of the embryo. They hypothesized that the embryonic pattern is regulated by the auxin transport mechanism and the polar positioning of cells within the ovule. The importance of auxin was shown, in their research, when carrot embryos, at different stages, were subjected to auxin transport inhibitors. The inhibitors that these carrots were subjected to made them unable to progress to later stages of embryogenesis. During the globular stage of embryogenesis, the embryos continued spherical expansion. In addition, oblong embryos continued axial growth, without the introduction of cotyledons. During the heart embryo stage of development, there were additional growth axes on hypocotyls. Further auxin transport inhibition research, conducted on Brassica juncea, shows that after germination, the cotyledons were fused and not two separate structures.

== Alternative forms of embryogenesis ==
=== Somatic embryogenesis ===
Somatic embryos are formed from plant cells that are not normally involved in the development of embryos, i.e. ordinary plant tissue. No endosperm or seed coat is formed around a somatic embryo. Applications of this process include: clonal propagation of genetically uniform plant material; elimination of viruses; provision of source tissue for genetic transformation; generation of whole plants from single cells called protoplasts; development of synthetic seed technology. Cells derived from competent source tissue are cultured to form an undifferentiated mass of cells called a callus. Plant growth regulators in the tissue culture medium can be manipulated to induce callus formation and subsequently changed to induce embryos to form the callus. The ratio of different plant growth regulators required to induce callus or embryo formation varies with the type of plant. Asymmetrical cell division also seems to be important in the development of somatic embryos, and while failure to form the suspensor cell is lethal to zygotic embryos, it is not lethal for somatic embryos.

=== Androgenesis ===
The process of androgenesis allows a mature plant embryo to form from a reduced, or immature, pollen grain. Androgenesis usually occurs under stressful conditions. Embryos that result from this mechanism can germinate into fully functional plants. As mentioned, the embryo results from a single pollen grain. Pollen grains consists of three cells - one vegetative cell containing two generative cells. According to Maraschin et al., androgenesis must be triggered during the asymmetric division of microspores. However, once the vegetative cell starts to make starch and proteins, androgenesis can no longer occur. Maraschin et al., indicates that this mode of embryogenesis consists of three phases. The first phase is the acquisition of embryonic potential, which is the repression of gametophyte formation, so that the differentiation of cells can occur. Then during the initiation of cell divisions, multicellular structures begin to form, which are contained by the exine wall. The last step of androgenesis is pattern formation, where the embryo-like structures are released out of the exile wall, in order for pattern formation to continue.

After these three phases occur, the rest of the process falls in line with the standard embryogenesis events.

== Plant growth and buds ==
Embryonic tissue is made up of actively growing cells and the term is normally used to describe the early formation of tissue in the first stages of growth. It can refer to different stages of the sporophyte and gametophyte plant; including the growth of embryos in seedlings, and to meristematic tissues, which are in a persistently embryonic state, to the growth of new buds on stems.

In both gymnosperms and angiosperms, the young plant contained in the seed, begins as a developing egg-cell formed after fertilization (sometimes without fertilization in a process called apomixis) and becomes a plant embryo. This embryonic condition also occurs in the buds that form on stems. The buds have tissue that has differentiated but not grown into complete structures. They can be in a resting state, lying dormant over winter or when conditions are dry, and then commence growth when conditions become suitable. Before they start growing into stem, leaves, or flowers, the buds are said to be in an embryonic state.
