= Verrey-sous-Salmaise =

- Commune
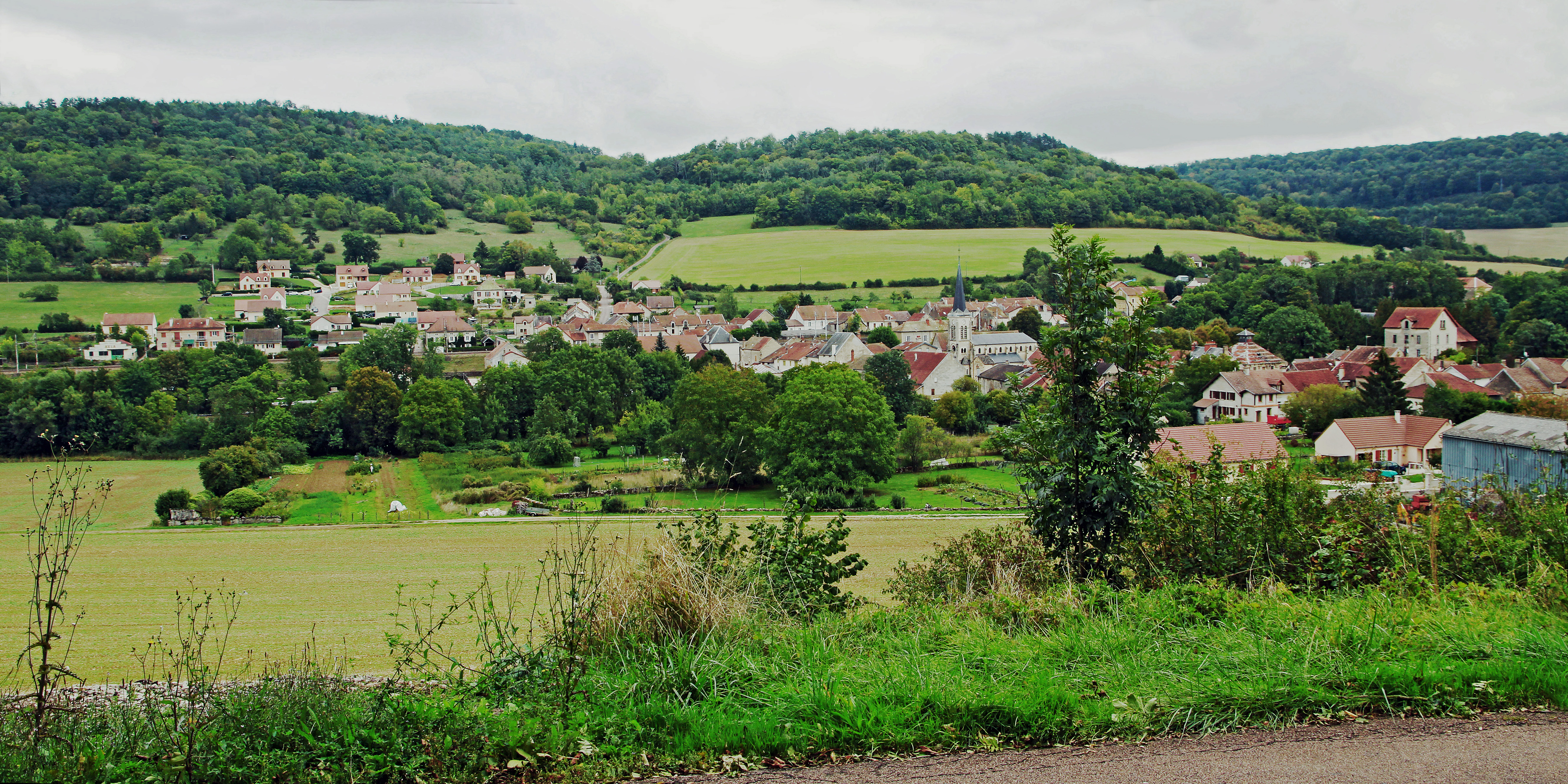
- A general view of Verrey-sous-Salmaise
- Location of Verrey-sous-Salmaise
- Location within France Location within Bourgogne-Franche-Comté
- Coordinates: 47°26′22″N 4°40′05″E
- Country: France
- Region: Bourgogne-Franche-Comté
- Department: Côte-d'Or
- Arrondissement: Montbard
- Canton: Montbard

Government
  - Mayor (2020–2026): Hubert Carré
- Area^{1}: 8.21 km^{2} (3.17 sq mi)
- Elevation: 340 m (1,120 ft)
- Highest elevation: 537 m (1,762 ft)
- Lowest elevation: 324 m (1,063 ft)
- Population (2023): 303
  - Density: 36.9/km^{2} (95.6/sq mi)
- Time zone: UTC+01:00 (CET)
  - Summer (DST): UTC+02:00 (CEST)
- INSEE/Postal code: 21670 /21690
- ^{1} French Land Register data, which excludes lakes, ponds, glaciers > 1 km^{2} (0.386 sq mi or 247 acres) and river estuaries.

Verrey-sous-Salmaise (French pronunciation: [vɛʁɛ su salmɛz], literally Verrey under Salmaise) is a commune in the Côte-d'Or department in eastern France.

== Population ==
Historical population
Year	Pop.	±% p.a.
1968	346	—
1975	271	−3.43%
1982	298	+1.37%
1990	301	+0.13%
1999	310	+0.33%
2007	321	+0.44%
2012	318	−0.19%
2017	289	−1.89%
2023	303	+0.79%
Source: INSEE

== See also ==
- Communes of the Côte-d'Or department
