= Cunninghamella bertholletiae =

Scientific classification
- Kingdom: Fungi
- Division: Mucoromycota
- Class: Mucoromycetes
- Order: Mucorales
- Family: Cunninghamellaceae
- Genus: Cunninghamella
- Species: C. bertholletiae

Binomial name
- Cunninghamella bertholletiae Stadel (1911)

Species of fungus

Cunninghamella bertholletiae is a species of zygomycetous fungi in the order Mucorales. It is found globally, with increased prevalence in Mediterranean and subtropical climates. It typically grows as a saprotroph and is found in a wide variety of substrates, including soil, fruits, vegetables, nuts, crops, and human and animal waste. Although infections are still rare, C. betholletiae is emerging as an opportunistic human pathogen, predominantly in immunocompromised people, leukemia patients, and people with uncontrolled diabetes. Cunninghamella bertholletiae infections are often highly invasive, and can be more difficult to treat with antifungal drugs than infections with other species of the Mucorales, making prompt and accurate recognition and diagnosis of mycoses caused by this fungus an important medical step for treatment.

== Growth and morphology ==
Cunninghamella bertholletiae grows as a mold. Individual cells appear hyaline, but masses of fungi are darker in colour. Colonies initially appear white, and become grey and powdery when they sporulate. Cunninghamella bertholletiae displays very rapid growth on Sabouraud's agar (up to 20mm per day), which differentiates it from members of the Ascomycota and Basidiomycota. However, culturing clinical materials infected by this species has been known to yield false negative results. This species has very wide (10-20 μm), aseptate or partially septate hyphae, which contributes to a high capacity for cytoplasmic streaming. Cytoplasmic streaming allows rapid diffusion of nutrients from a local nutrient source, which causes high growth rates and rapid nutrient depletion in culture or on limited substrates. Like other members of the order Mucorales, C. bertholletiae is thermotolerant, with a maximum growth temperature of 45-50˚C.

Hyphae branch at right angles and may appear twisted. When growing in animal tissue, hyphae spread in all dimensions. Cunninghamella bertholletiae produces spores in globose sporangia atop sporangiophores that are typically tall enough to be visible without a microscope. Sporangiophores vary in length, and branch laterally to form concentric circles of shorter branches. They lack the columella and apophysis present in sporangiophores of many other species of the Mucorales. Due to the appearance of molds in this taxonomic order (a long stalk with a round, upward-pointing tip), members are often called "pin molds". Unlike other members of the Mucorales, Cunninghamella species produce only one spore in each sporangium. Sporangia form a halo around a central, round vesicle at the apex of a sporangiophore. Spores are round to oval in shape and rough, with small spines or wart-like bumps. The hyphae of C. bertholletiae may or may not produce rhizoids at the base of the sporangiophores.

== Physiology and reproduction ==
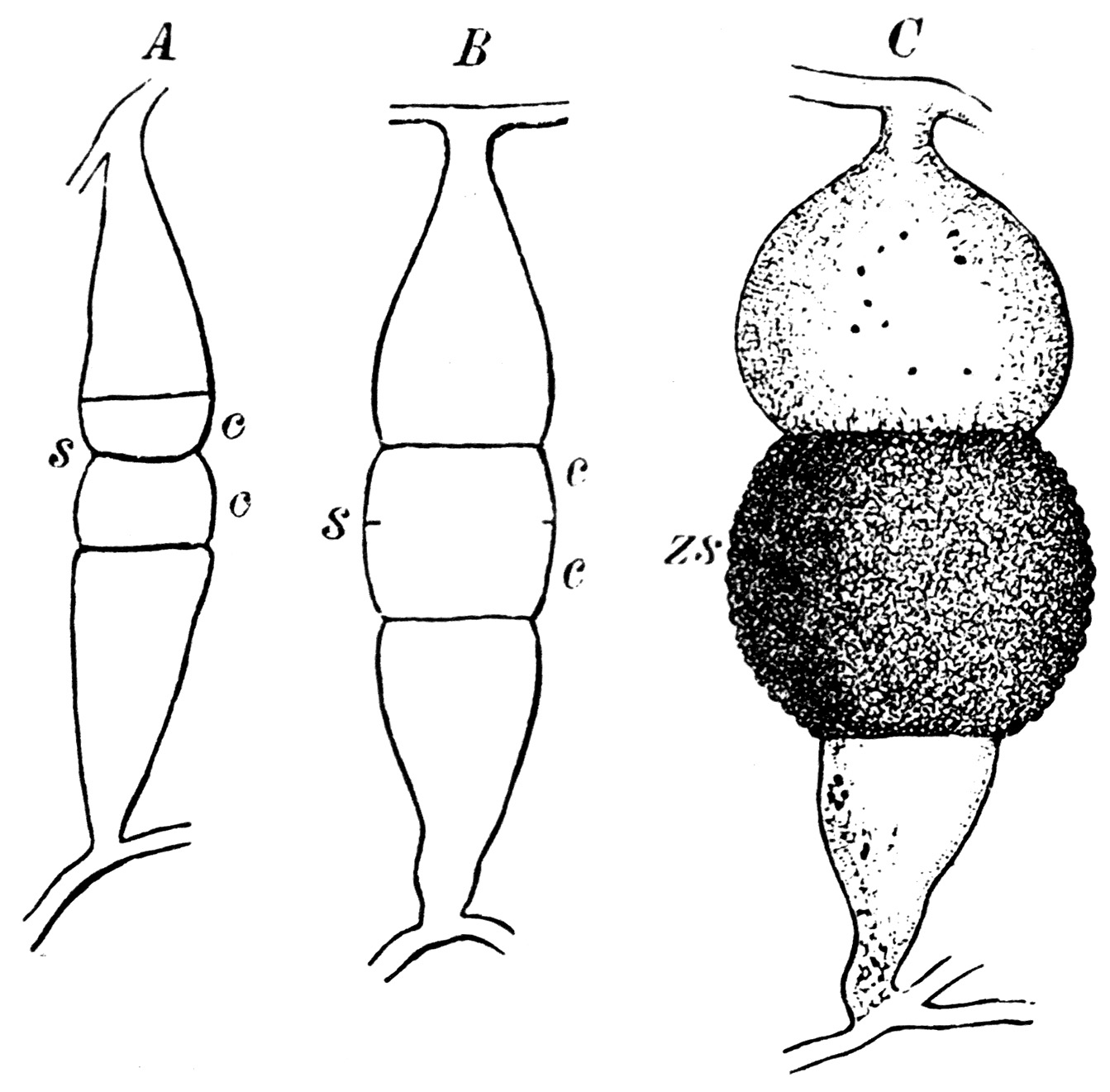
The formation of zygospores by two mating gametangia.

As previously mentioned, C. bertholletiae grow hyphally and reproduce asexually via branching sporangiophores. Unlike in the case of dimorphic pathogenic fungi, growth of C. bertholletiae is inhibited by cycloheximide.

As a member of the Zygomycota, sexual reproduction in C. bertholletiae is through the formation of zygospores. Specifically, in the case of C. bertholletiae, heterothallic mating occurs when hyphae of opposite mating types are stimulated by mutually-secreted pheromones to grow toward each other and differentiate into gametangia. When they meet, these gametangia fuse (plasmogamy) and form a multinucleate, dikaryotic zygosporangium flanked by suspensor cells derived from the contributing hyphae. Each zygosporangium produces one zygospore, which, after a dormant period of weeks to months, undergoes nuclear fusion (karyogamy) to produce a diploid nucleus. The diploid nucleus then undergoes meiosis and chromosomes recombine to produce recombinant progeny genomes. A germosporangium forms, containing haploid spores, which are released into the environment to initiate the growth of a new mycelium.

Cunninghamella betholletiae is not used widely in industry, but it is applied in industrial bioconversion to produce polyunsaturated acids.

== Habitat and ecology ==
Cunninghamella bertholletiae is found globally as a fruit and vegetable pathogen, as well as a cause of fruit and vegetable wastage due to rotting. However, it is more common in Mediterranean and subtropical zones than in temperate zones, and can grow at higher temperatures. Its usual life cycle involves saprotrophy, and it is commonly found on dung, rotting vegetables, fruit, nuts and seeds, soil, compost, sewage, and peat. Cunnginhamella bertholletiae can cause significant infections in agricultural crops. Hosts include plants in the genera Daucus, Gossypium and Tetragonia. Cunninghamella bertholletiae can also be an opportunistic pathogen of both humans and animals, mainly in immunocompromised hosts. It can be transmitted between ecological niches via water and air. The vast majority of the time, human infection is through airborne spores, although infections of deep wounds and medical devices can also occur through water contamination.

== Human disease ==
Role in human disease

Cunninghamella bertholletiae is by far the most predominant opportunistic human pathogen of the genus Cunninghamella. Infections with this fungus are classified as opportunistic zygomycoses or mucormycoses, and risk factors for infection are similar for other mucormycoses, including diabetic ketoacidosis, and immunosuppression from chemotherapy, organ transplantation, and malnutrition. Leukemia is a particularly high risk factor. HIV-associated cases have been reported, but serious cases are more often seen in leukemia patients. Disseminated infections have also been noted in renal and hepatic transplant patients. Infection often occurs through traumatic introductions into the body (i.e. through a wound).

Cunninghamella bertholletiae can infect a wide variety of human tissue types, exhibits hyphal growth in the body and is angioinvasive. Like other Mucorales, under appropriate host conditions, it can grow very aggressively and destroy tissue structure. Typically, initial pathology is from thrombosis and infarction. Common classes of mucormycoses include pulmonary, rhinocerebral (particularly when invasion into the vasculature of the brain is involved), multi-organ, cutaneous, and gastrointestinal (primarily in premature babies and malnourished children). Rhinocerebral infection and gastrointestinal cases are most immediately life-threatening. Pulmonary infections, as well as disseminated infections with pulmonary origins, are most common for C. bertholletiae, which has been identified in 7% of mucormycosis cases globally, and 3.2% of cases in the United States.

Diagnosis and treatment

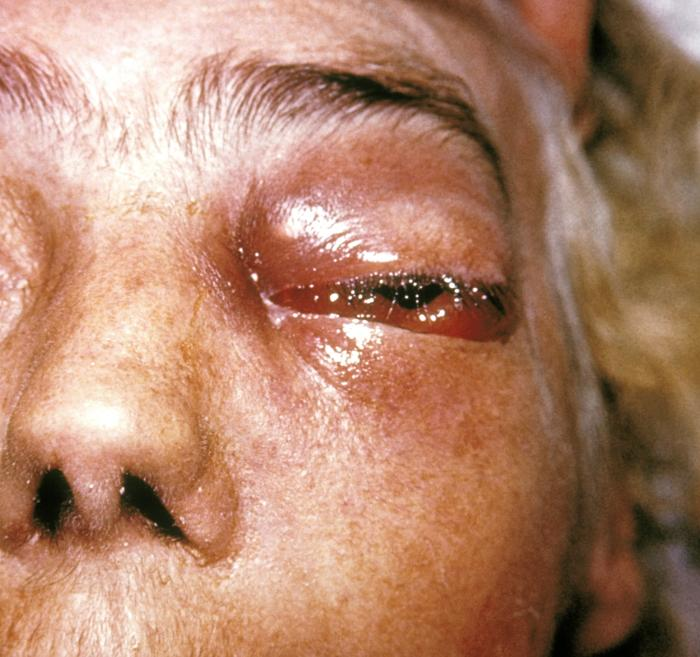
A case of periorbiatal mucormycosis, a sign of highly invasive rhinocerebral C. bertholletiae infection.

Although C. bertholletiae is only responsible for a small percentage of mucormycoses, it is cited as having the worst prognosis of the Mucorales. There are few identified cases per year, but C. bertholletiae infections and other mucormycoses are increasing in prevalence in North America, possibly due to growing populations of aging and immunosuppressed people.

Vascular invasion and tissue necrosis, often with black discharge, are good indicators of infection with Mucorales. Cunninghamella bertholletiae can also grow at higher temperatures, which can be helpful in testing contaminated surfaces to differentiate between benign and pathogenic fungi. Infections from the six different taxonomic families of Mucorales have virtually indistinguishable clinical courses. Furthermore, the difficulty of culturing C. bertholletiae and other species within Mucorales from tissue samples makes laboratory analysis necessary to determine the causative organism of a mucormycosis. Polymerase chain reaction-based sequencing of fungal isolates is preferred as a reliable diagnostic tool due to possible difficulty of isolating C. bertholletiae from patients in culture. However, preliminary antifungal treatment should never be delayed if C. bertholletiae infection is suspected, as infections can often cause rapid and invasive tissue damage. Genetic differences within the species C. bertholletiae can also be important determinants of pathogenicity and virulence. Recently, DNA barcoding of the internal transcribed spacer (ITS) region of C. bertholletiae ribosomal DNA was performed to improve upon current diagnostic techniques, providing more accurate and detailed between- and within-species discrimination compared to traditional analysis of colony colour and morphology, maximum growth temperature, and reproductive characteristics.

Because of its fast growth and invasiveness, treatment for C. bertholletiae infection can be expected to often require surgery in addition to antifungal treatment. Immediate surgery is especially important in the case of rhinocerebral infection, in order to avoid dissemination into the vasculature of the brain and to avoid permanent optic nerve damage. Surgical debridement is a common treatment. Bacterial superinfection of debrided tissues after treatment can therefore be a significant problem. Antifungal drugs that are used successfully against C. bertholletiae infection include amphotericin B, itraconazole, voriconazole and posaconazole. However, compared to other Mucorales species, C. bertholletiae has decreased responsiveness to some antifungals that are commonly prescribed to treat mucormycoses, and samples should be tested for individual antibiotic susceptibility if possible. Lipid formulations of amphotericin B are preferred for treatment of C. berthollettiae, because the high dosage required to treat infection can have significant toxic effects when administered in traditional formulations. Relapse after antifungal treatment and surgery is rare if a patient's clinical course initially improves during therapy.

Special case: ketoacidotic diabetes and iron availability

In cases of uncontrolled diabetes, where ketoacidosis is present and glucose levels are above 12mM, C. bertholletiae infection is promoted and can be highly invasive. This may related to effects of low pH on iron acquisition, as low pH decreases affinity of transferrin for iron, freeing iron from its usual sequestration in blood and making if more available for fungal exploitation. Because a primary factor in patient susceptibility to C. bertholletiae is increased iron availability, any condition that increases blood iron availability creates an increased risk of infection. Patients undergoing iron chelation therapy with deferoxamine are also at risk of infection, because this treatment also increases accessible iron for C. bertholletiae. Furthermore, C. bertholletiae was identified as the causative agent of a fatal case of rhinocerebral mucormycosis in a patient with hemochromatosis, expanding the recognized risk factors for infection.
