= Hyalopycnis =

Scientific classification
- Domain: Eukaryota
- Kingdom: Fungi
- Division: Basidiomycota
- Class: Microbotryomycetes
- Order: Heterogastridiales
- Family: Heterogastridiaceae
- Genus: Hyalopycnis; Höhn. (1918)
- Species: H. hyalina

Binomial name
- Hyalopycnis hyalina Höhn. (1918)

Synonyms
- Heterogastridium Oberw. & R.Bauer (1990)

Genus of fungi

Hyalopycnis is a genus of fungi in the subdivision Pucciniomycotina. The genus is currently monotypic, comprising the single species Hyalopycnis hyalina (other named species being regarded as synonyms). This was originally described as a minute, pycnidial (flask-shaped), anamorphic fungus, later found to be basidiomycetous. Later still, a teleomorphic state was found, producing auricularioid (laterally septate) basidia and basidiospores that are tetraradiate (with four appendages). This latter state was given the name Heterogastridium pycnidioideum, but, following changes to the International Code of Nomenclature for algae, fungi, and plants, the practice of giving different names to teleomorph and anamorph forms of the same fungus was discontinued, meaning that Heterogastridium became a synonym of the earlier name Hyalopycnis. The species was described from Europe and is also known from North America and Japan, growing on decaying fungal fruit bodies or vegetable matter.
