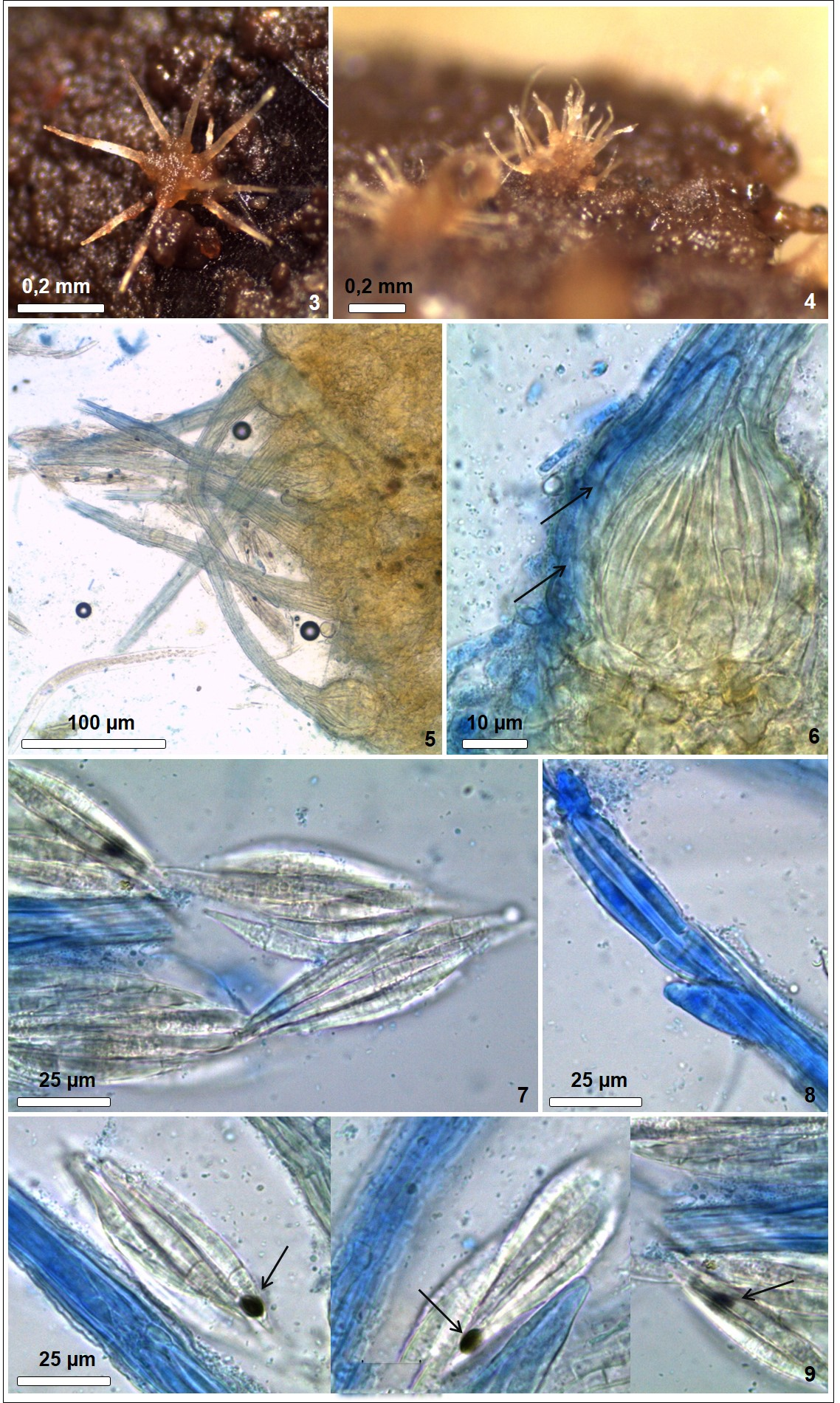
- Pyxidiophora arvernensis

Scientific classification
- Kingdom: Fungi
- Division: Ascomycota
- Class: Laboulbeniomycetes
- Order: Pyxidiophorales
- Family: Pyxidiophoraceae
- Genus: Pyxidiophora; Bref. & Tavel (1891)

Type species
- Pyxidiophora nyctalidis Bref. & Tavel (1891)

= Pyxidiophora =

Genus of fungi

Pyxidiophora is a genus of arthropod-associated fungi in the family Pyxidiophoraceae. It was circumscribed by mycologists Julius Oscar Brefeld and Franz von tavel in 1891. P. nyctalidis is the type species.

== Species ==
- Pyxidiophora arvernensis (Breton & Faurel) N.Lundq. (1980)
- Pyxidiophora asterophora (Tul. & C.Tul.) Lindau (1897)
- Pyxidiophora badiorostris N.Lundq. (1980)
- Pyxidiophora bainemensis (Breton & Faurel) N.Lundq. (1980)
- Pyxidiophora caulicola (D.Hawksw. & J.Webster) N.Lundq. (1980)
- Pyxidiophora corallisetosa R.Kirschner (2003)
- Pyxidiophora cuniculicola R.Kirschner (2003)
- Pyxidiophora fusco-olivacea (G.R.W.Arnold) N.Lundq. (1980)
- Pyxidiophora fusispora (Tul. & C.Tul.) Maire (1911)
- Pyxidiophora grovei (D.Hawksw. & J.Webster) N.Lundq. (1980)
- Pyxidiophora kimbroughii M.Blackw. & T.J.Perry (1986)
- Pyxidiophora lundqvistii Corlett (1986)
- Pyxidiophora marchalii (Sacc.) N.Lundq. (1980)
- Pyxidiophora microspora (D.Hawksw. & J.Webster) N.Lundq. (1980)
- Pyxidiophora moseri (T.Majewski & J.Wisn.) N.Lundq. (1980)
- Pyxidiophora nyctalidis Bref. & Tavel (1891)
- Pyxidiophora petchii (Breton & Faurel) N.Lundq. (1980)
- Pyxidiophora schotteriana (Breton & Faurel) N.Lundq. (1980)
- Pyxidiophora spinuliformis (Speg.) N.Lundq. (1980)
- Pyxidiophora spinulorostrata J.Webster & D.Hawksw. (1986)
- Pyxidiophora subbasalipunctata (T.Majewski & J.Wisn.) N.Lundq. (1980)
