= Louis Matruchot =

French mycologist

Alphonse Louis Paul Matruchot (born 14 January 1863 in Verrey-sous-Salmaise and died 5 July 1921 in Paris) was a French mycologist.

In 1883 he began work as an assistant teacher at the Lycée Saint-Louis in Paris. In 1889 he received his agrégation for natural sciences, becoming a préparateur of botany at the École normale supérieure (serving from 1889 to 1892). He earned his doctorate in 1892, later being appointed chef de travaux pratiques to the faculty of Paris. In 1902-04 he was a lecturer at the École normale supérieure, followed by an assignment as deputy assistant professor (1904–12).

Matruchot was a member of the Société mycologique de France and the Société botanique de France (1890).

== Selected publications ==
- Recherches sur le développement de quelques mucédinées, 1892 – Research on the development of some mucidines.
- Les mycelium truffiers blancs, 1903 with Émile Boulanger – The white truffle mycelium.
- Notice sommaire sur les travaux scientifiques de M. Louis Matruchot, 1917 – Summary guide on the scientific work of Louis Matruchot.
- Sur la culture artificielle de la truffe, – On the artificial culture of truffles.
