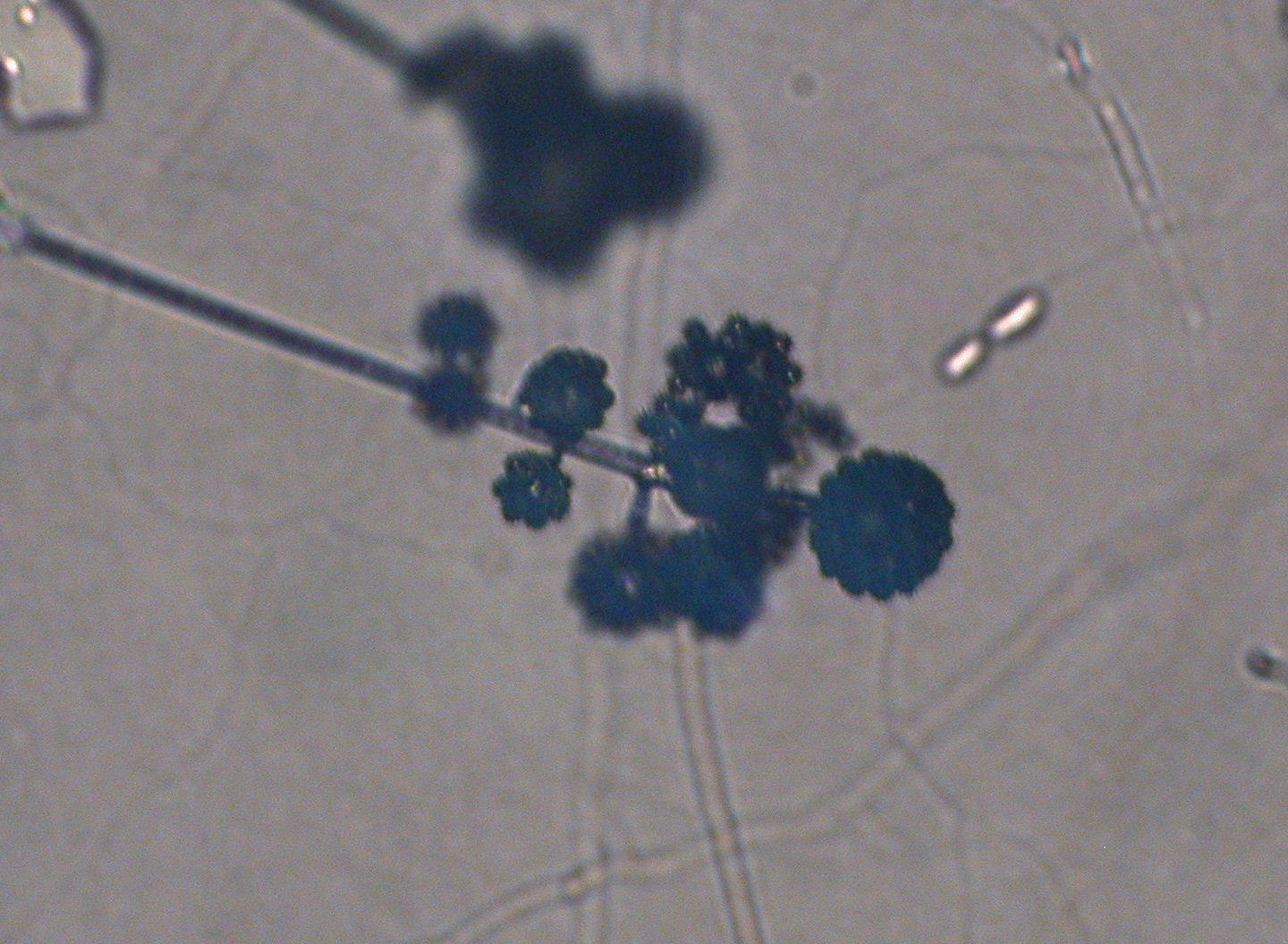
- Cunninghamella echinulata

Scientific classification
- Kingdom: Fungi
- Division: Mucoromycota
- Class: Mucoromycetes
- Order: Mucorales
- Family: Cunninghamellaceae; Naumov ex R.K.Benj. (1959)

Type genus
- Cunninghamella Matr. (1903)

Genera
- Absidia; Chlamydoabsidia; Cunninghamella; Gongronella; Halteromyces; Hesseltinella

= Cunninghamellaceae =

Family of fungi

The Cunninghamellaceae are a family of fungi in the order Mucorales.

== Taxonomy ==
At one time, this family contained four genera. At present, the number of genera in this family is under debate. According to Benny and Alexopoulos, the family only contains the genus Cunninghamella. However, other (recent) authors have listed other genera, including Absidia, Halteromyces, and Hesseltinella. The full list can be viewed at the webpage Cunninghamellaceae maintained by Gerald L. Benny.

== Morphology ==
Hyphae are coenocytic and produce sporangiophores covered in calcium oxalate. Sporangiophores give rise to pedicellate, unispored sporangia. In many cases, the wall of the sporangium and the spore have fused. Zygospores tend to be ornamented and reddish-brown with opposed suspensors.

== Ecology ==
Cunninghamella species are commonly encountered in forest soils, dung, and nuts from the tropics. Species can be isolated using Czapek medium incubated for 3–4 days at 28-31C. A few species are known human pathogens.
