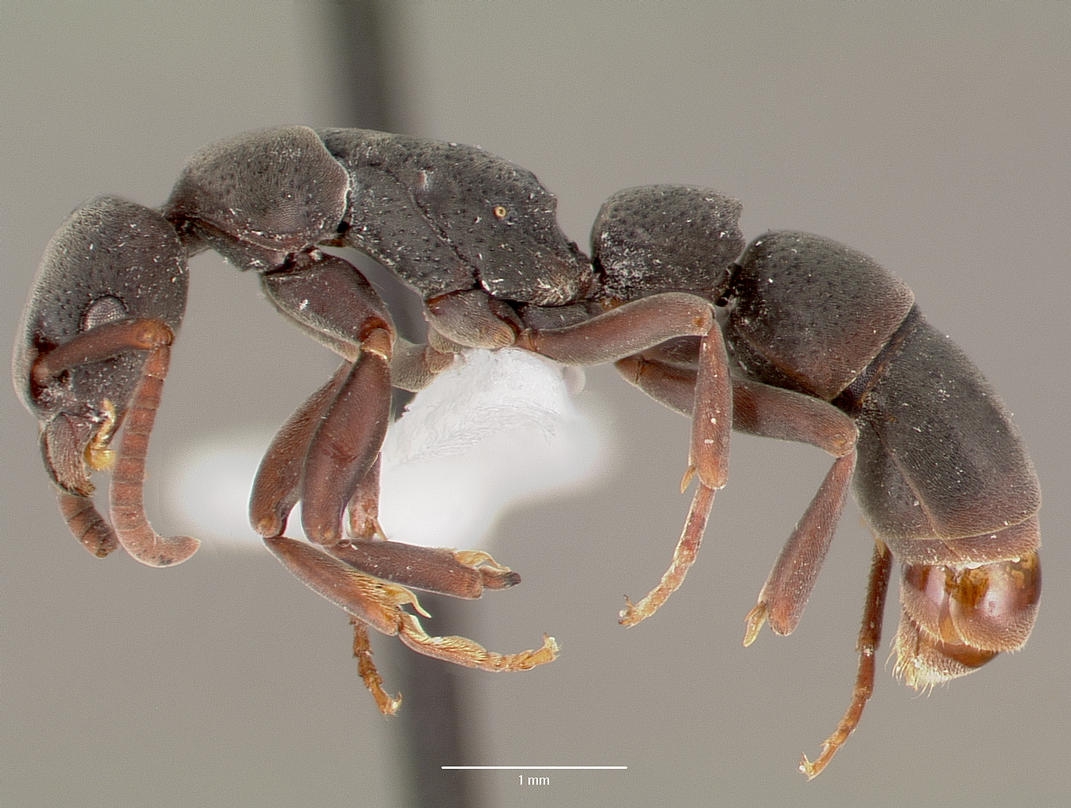
- Platythyrea punctata worker

Scientific classification
- Kingdom: Animalia
- Phylum: Arthropoda
- Clade: Pancrustacea
- Class: Insecta
- Order: Hymenoptera
- Family: Formicidae
- Subfamily: Ponerinae
- Tribe: Platythyreini; Emery, 1901
- Genus: Platythyrea; Roger, 1863

Type species
- Pachycondyla punctata Roger, 1863

Diversity
- 45 species

Synonyms
- Eubothroponera Clark, 1930

= Platythyrea =

Platythyrea Temporal range: Eocene – Recent 52.2–0 Ma

Genus of ants

Platythyrea is a genus of predaceous ants in the subfamily Ponerinae and the sole member of the tribe Platythyreini.

== Distribution ==
The genus has a worldwide distribution, and is found in the tropics and subtropics of the world.

== Description ==
Workers are small to very large in size (4–20 mm). Gamergates (reproductive female workers) are known from all studied species except one, P. conradti, which have ergatoid queens (wingless reproductive ants, intermediate in form between workers and winged queens). Some species with gamergates also have alate queens, which are similar to the workers but winged.

The effects of central fusion and terminal fusion on heterozygosity

== Parthenogenesis ==
Parthenogenesis is a natural form of reproduction in which growth and development of embryos occur without fertilisation. Thelytoky is a particular form of parthenogenesis in which the development of a female individual occurs from an unfertilized egg. Automixis is a form of thelytoky, but there are different kinds of automixis. The kind of automixis relevant here is one in which two haploid products from the same meiosis combine to form a diploid zygote (see diagram).

Colonies of Platythyrea punctata from Florida and the Caribbean Islands produce offspring almost exclusively by automictic thelytoky. Automixis appears to involve central fusion of two of the haploid products of meiosis (see diagram). This form of automixis tends to maintain heterozygosity in transmission of the genome from mother to offspring, and to minimize inbreeding depression. Furthermore, crossover recombination occurs at a greatly reduced rate during meiosis, which likely restrains the transition from heterozygosity to homozygosity.

== Species ==
- Platythyrea angusta Forel, 1901
- Platythyrea arnoldi Forel, 1913
- Platythyrea arthuri Forel, 1910
- Platythyrea bicuspis Emery, 1899
- Platythyrea bidentata Brown, 1975
- Platythyrea brevidentata Wheeler, 1922
- Platythyrea brunnipes (Clark, 1938)
- Platythyrea clypeata Forel, 1911
- Platythyrea conradti Emery, 1899
- Platythyrea cooperi Arnold, 1915
- Platythyrea cribrinodis (Gerstäcker, 1859)
- Platythyrea crucheti Santschi, 1911
- †Platythyrea dentata Lattke, 2003
- Platythyrea dentinodis (Clark, 1930)
- †Platythyrea dlusskyi Aria, Perrichot & Nel, 2011
- Platythyrea exigua Kempf, 1964
- Platythyrea frontalis Emery, 1899
- Platythyrea gracillima Wheeler, 1922
- Platythyrea inermis Forel, 1910
- Platythyrea lamellosa (Roger, 1860)
- Platythyrea lenca De Andrade, 2004
- Platythyrea matopoensis Arnold, 1915
- Platythyrea micans (Clark, 1930)
- Platythyrea mocquerysi Emery, 1899
- Platythyrea modesta Emery, 1899
- Platythyrea nicobarensis Forel, 1905
- Platythyrea occidentalis André, 1890
- Platythyrea parallela (Smith, 1859)
- Platythyrea pilosula (Smith, 1858)
- †Platythyrea primaeva Wheeler, 1915
- Platythyrea prizo Kugler, 1977
- †Platythyrea procera Lattke, 2003
- †Platythyrea pumilio De Andrade, 2004
- Platythyrea punctata (Smith, 1858)
- Platythyrea quadridenta Donisthorpe, 1941
- Platythyrea sagei Forel, 1900
- †Platythyrea scalpra Lattke, 2003
- Platythyrea schultzei Forel, 1910
- Platythyrea sinuata (Roger, 1860)
- Platythyrea strenua Wheeler & Mann, 1914
- Platythyrea tenuis Emery, 1899
- Platythyrea tricuspidata Emery, 1900
- Platythyrea turneri Forel, 1895
- Platythyrea viehmeyeri Santschi, 1914
- Platythyrea zodion Brown, 1975
