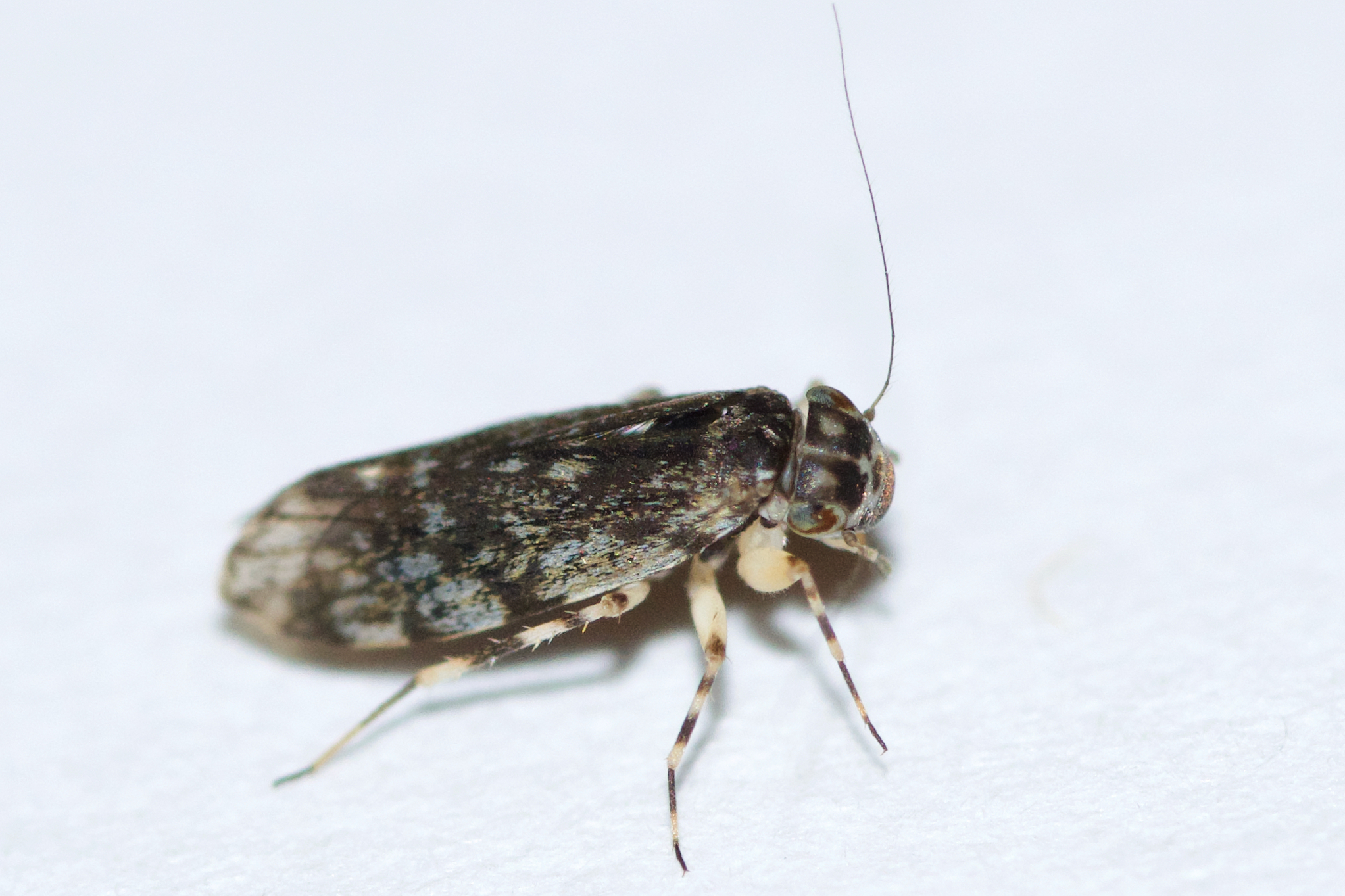

Scientific classification
- Kingdom: Animalia
- Phylum: Arthropoda
- Clade: Pancrustacea
- Class: Insecta
- Order: Psocodea
- Family: Amphientomidae
- Genus: Stimulopalpus
- Species: S. japonicus

Binomial name
- Stimulopalpus japonicus Enderlein, 1906

= Stimulopalpus japonicus =

Species of barklouse

The Japanese barklouse (Stimulopalpus japonicus) is a species of tropical barklouse in the family Amphientomidae, described by German biologist Günther Enderlein in 1906. Males are unknown, suggesting females might reproduce by thelytoky. It is native to Japan, but also found elsewhere in East Asia, and in South Asia. It was inadvertently introduced to the United States (in the 1940s) and to Italy. They are often found congregating on rocks and concrete.
