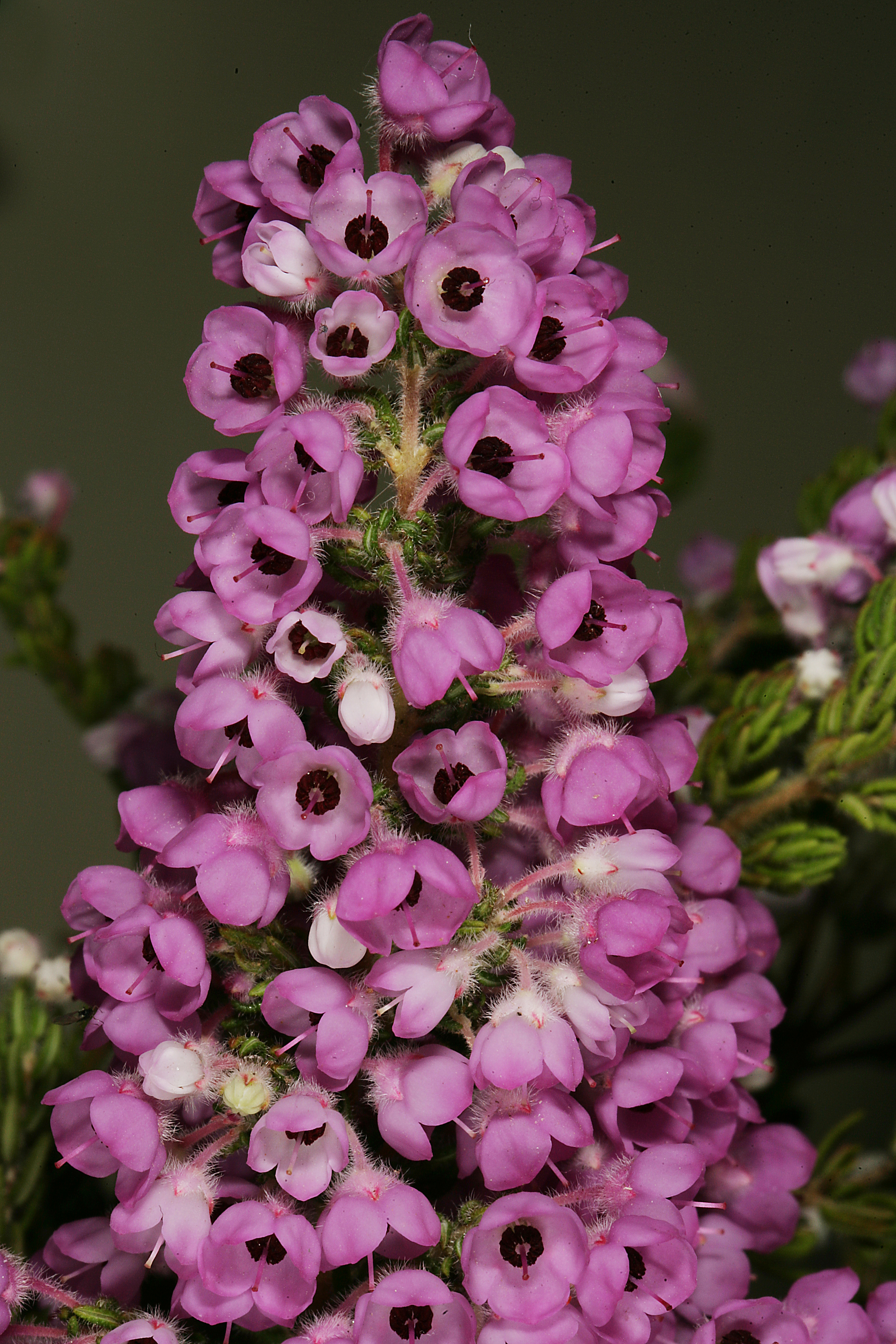

Scientific classification
- Kingdom: Plantae
- Clade: Tracheophytes
- Clade: Angiosperms
- Clade: Eudicots
- Clade: Asterids
- Order: Ericales
- Family: Ericaceae
- Genus: Erica
- Species: E. chamissonis

Binomial name
- Erica chamissonis Klotzsch ex Benth.

Synonyms
- Ericoides chamissonis (Klotzsch ex Benth.) Kuntze

= Erica chamissonis =

Species of flowering plant

Erica chamissonis is a plant belonging to the genus Erica. The species is endemic to the Eastern Cape. This plant is one of eight species of the fynbos biome that are the main sources of pollen and honey for Apis mellifera capensis, the Cape honeybee.

The plant has three varieties:

- Erica chamissonis var. chamissonis
- Erica chamissonis var. hirtifolia Dulfer
- Erica chamissonis var. polyantha (Klotzsch ex Benth.) Dulfer
