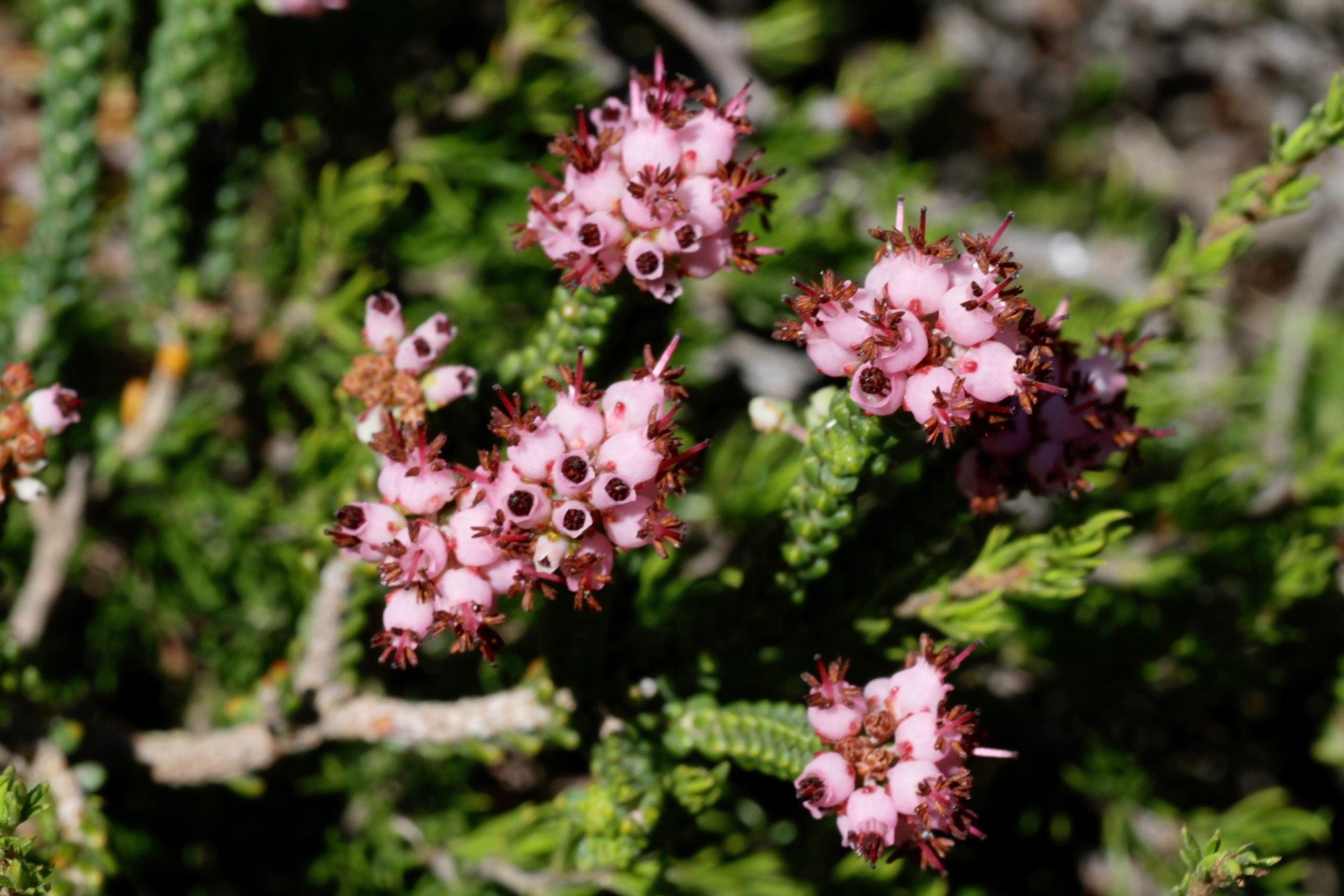

Scientific classification
- Kingdom: Plantae
- Clade: Tracheophytes
- Clade: Angiosperms
- Clade: Eudicots
- Clade: Asterids
- Order: Ericales
- Family: Ericaceae
- Genus: Erica
- Species: E. demissa

Binomial name
- Erica demissa Klotzsch ex Benth.

Synonyms
- Ectasis demissa (Klotzsch ex Benth.) G.Don; Erica globuliflora (Klotzsch ex Benth.; Ericoides demissum ((Klotzsch ex Benth.) Kuntze

= Erica demissa =

Species of flowering plant

Erica demissa is a plant belonging to the genus Erica and forming part of the fynbos. The species is endemic to the Western Cape.

This plant is one of the 54 plant species used as primary nectar and pollen sources by Cape honeybees, Apis mellifera capensis, and has been studied in the Eastern Cape Province in an area where fynbos vegetation mixes with grassland communities.
