= Honeybee Heroes =

Nonprofit organisation based in South Africa

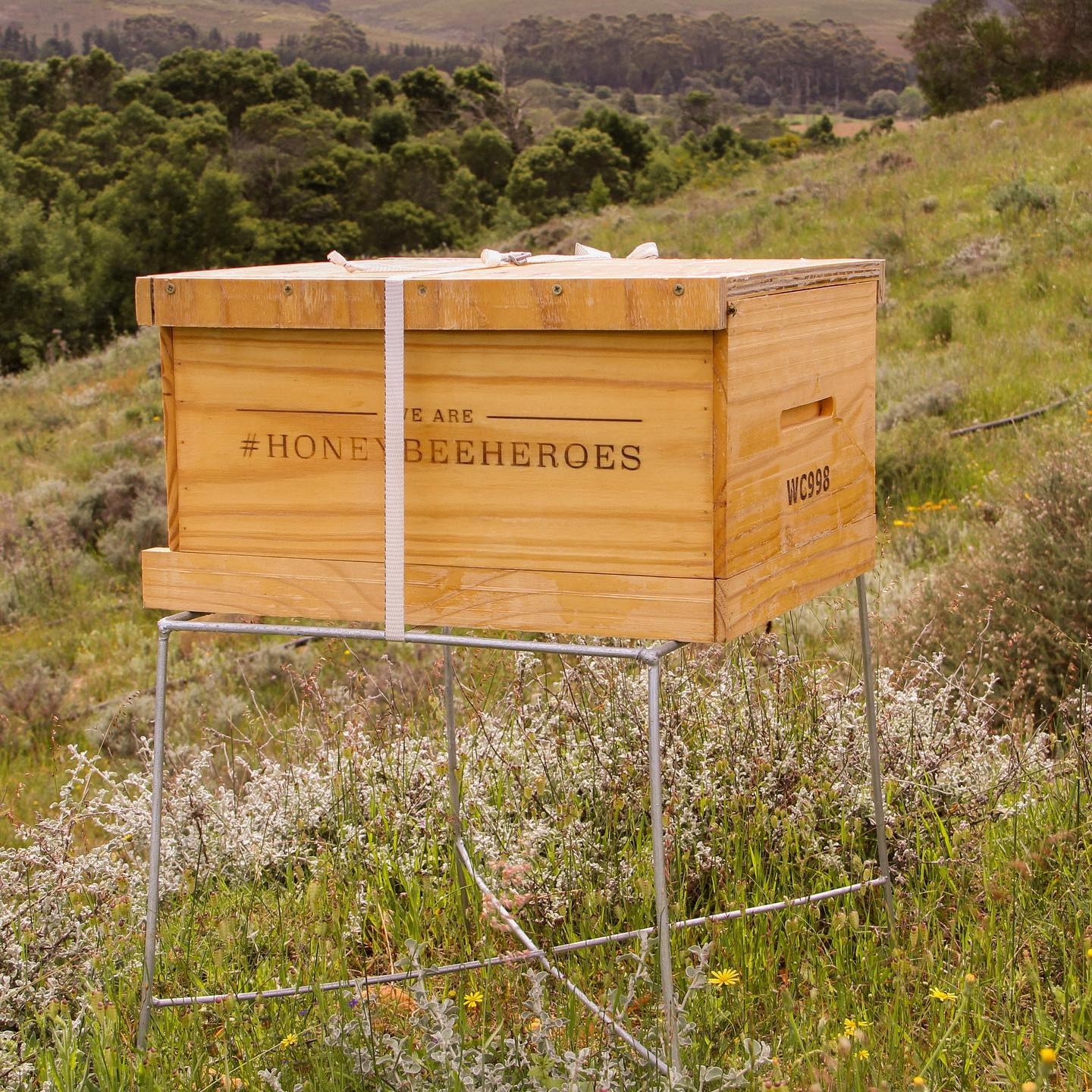

Honeybee Heroes is a honeybee sanctuary and beekeeper education non-profit organisation founded in 2020 by Chris Oosthuizen in the Overberg region of South Africa.

Honeybee Heroes seeks to increase population numbers of the endemic Capensis honeybee subspecies (Apis mellifera capensis), which is increasingly at risk due to a number of factors including monocropping, pesticide use, beekeeper malpractice, habitat loss, and climate change. Secondary activities of the organisation include educating South African consumers on honey adulteration and encouraging them to purchase from local producers. Working with local farmers to create more environmentally friendly cultivation techniques, including the planting of pollinator-friendly cover crops, and other general honeybee welfare advocacy activities.

Through Honeybee Heroes' Adopt-a-Hive program, individuals in South Africa or overseas, sponsor beehives, which are then placed on the Honeybee Heroes farm in Stanford Valley (Western Cape, South Africa) or on nearby farms and private reserves. Sponsored hives are cared for by the Honeybee Heroes expert apiarists, who extract honey from the hives and sell locally to help support the sanctuary project.

Honeybee Heroes offers free and paid monthly beekeeping courses for interested beginners, in which visitors are trained in safety, hive management, and honey extraction. The organisation also runs a community micro-apiary programme, in which low-income South Africans, primarily women, are trained to care for hives on land donated by private land owners or reserves and receive a portion of the profits from the honey produced to uplift themselves and their families.

Honeybee Heroes has partnerships with several local and international organisations, including a consumer education program with South Africa's leading health and wellness retailer Wellness Warehouse, a hive adoption partnership with Mantis Collection's nonprofit arm Community Conservation Fund Africa, apiary hosting partnerships with local small businesses Lomond Wine Estate and Stonehouse Cheese Estate, and a label design project with local South African visual artists including Lionel Smit, Riaan Van Zyl, and Janko de Beer.

The Honeybee Heroes sanctuary has over 700 honeybee hives.
