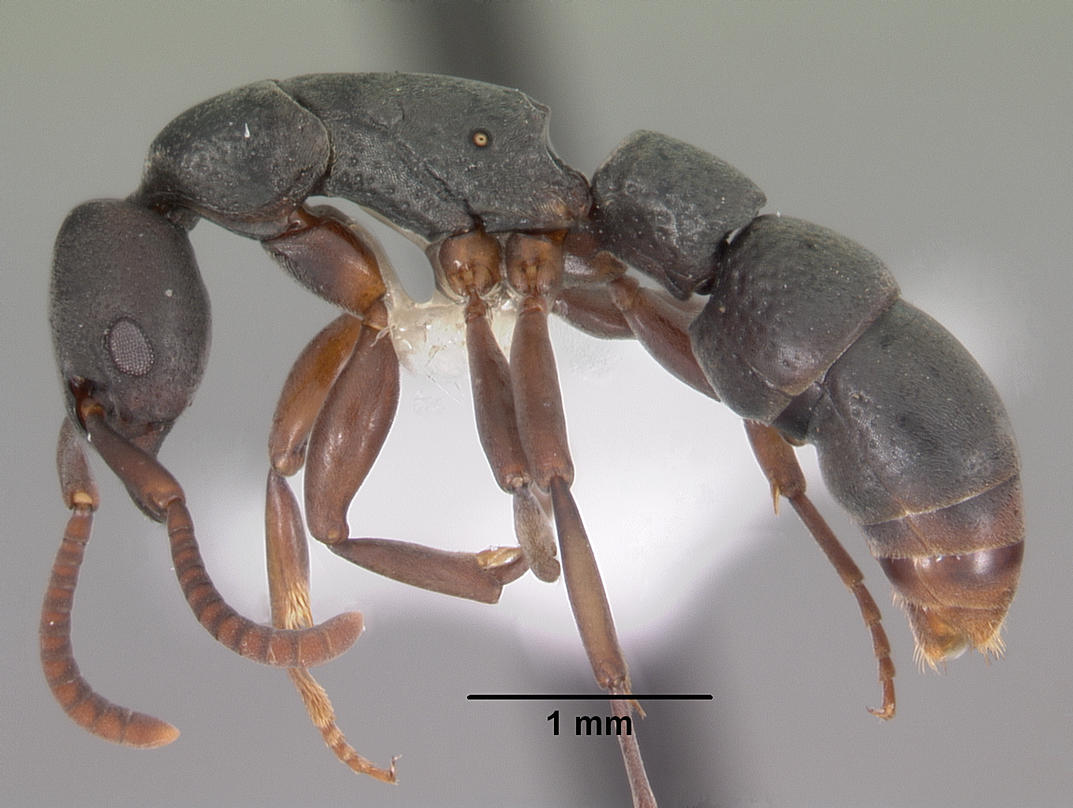

Scientific classification
- Kingdom: Animalia
- Phylum: Arthropoda
- Clade: Pancrustacea
- Class: Insecta
- Order: Hymenoptera
- Family: Formicidae
- Genus: Platythyrea
- Species: P. parallela

Binomial name
- Platythyrea parallela (Smith, F., 1859)

Synonyms
- Platythyrea cephalotes Viehmeyer, 1924; Platythyrea ceylonensis Donisthorpe, 1941; Platythyrea coxalis Emery, 1893; Platythyrea coxalis annamita Forel, 1911; Platythyrea coxalis cylindrica Forel, 1913; Platythyrea coxalis javana Forel, 1905; Platythyrea coxalis philippinensis Viehmeyer, 1916; Platythyrea coxalis tritschleri Forel, 1901; Platythyrea inconspicua Mayr, 1870; Platythyrea melancholica aruana Karavaiev, 1925; Platythyrea parva Crawley, 1915; Platythyrea pulchella Santschi, 1928; Platythyrea pusilla Emery, 1893; Platythyrea pusilla australis Forel, 1915; Platythyrea pusilla egena Viehmeyer, 1916; Platythyrea pusilla pacifica Santschi, 1928; Platythyrea subtilis Emery, 1900; Platythyrea wroughtoni sechellensis Forel, 1912; Platythyrea wroughtoni victoriae Forel, 1900; Platythyrea wroughtonii Forel, 1900

= Platythyrea parallela =

Species of ant

Platythyrea parallela, is a species of ant of the subfamily Ponerinae. It is a cosmopolitan species.
