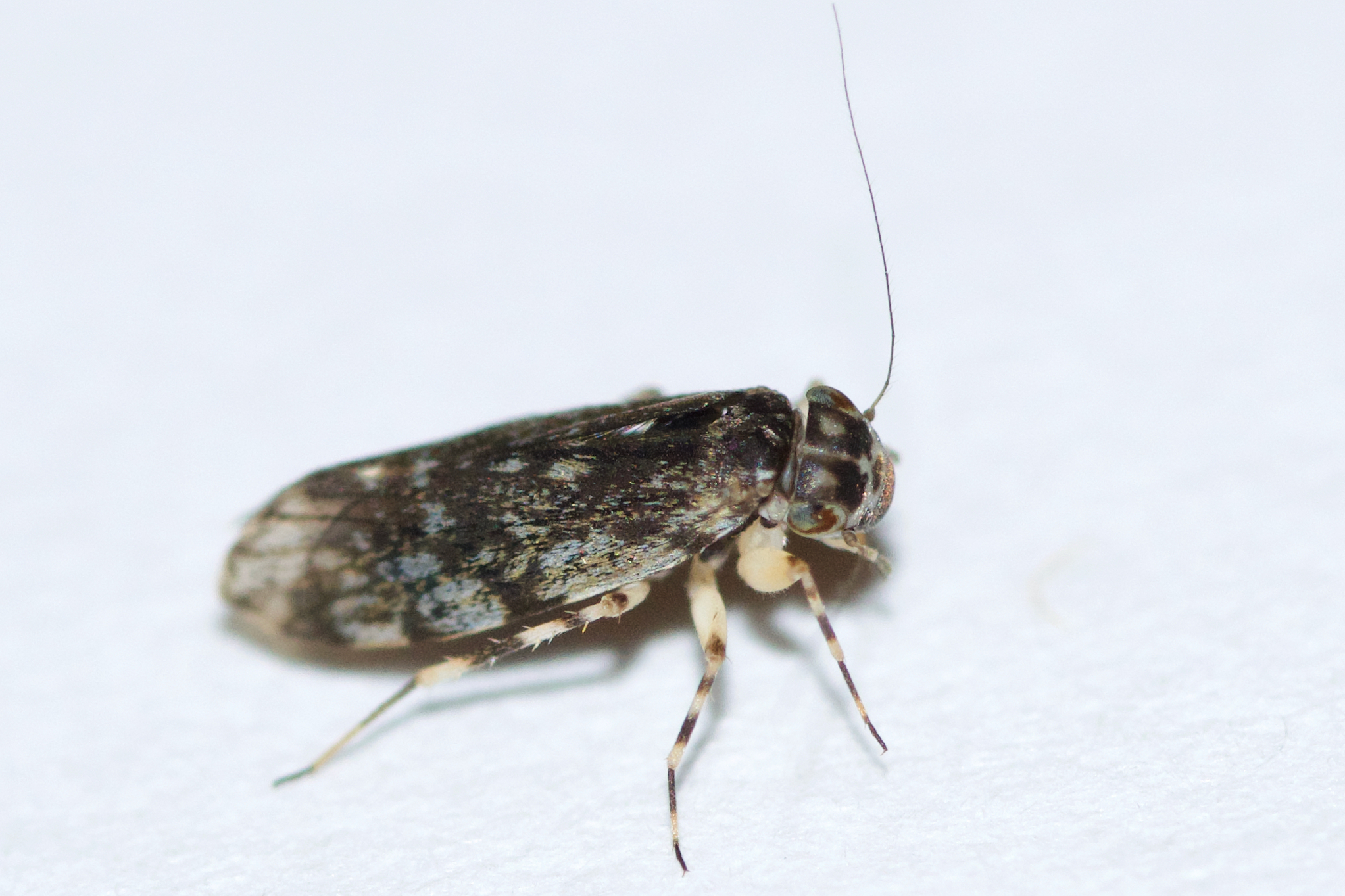
- Stimulopalpus japonicus

Scientific classification
- Kingdom: Animalia
- Phylum: Arthropoda
- Class: Insecta
- Order: Psocodea
- Family: Amphientomidae
- Genus: Stimulopalpus; Enderlein, 1906

Species
- See text

= Stimulopalpus =

Genus of barklice

Stimulopalpus is a genus of tropical barklice in the family Amphientomidae. There are at least 30 described species in Stimulopalpus.

== Species ==
These 30 species belong to the genus Stimulopalpus:

- Stimulopalpus acutipinnatus Li, 2002
- Stimulopalpus africanus Enderlein, 1907
- Stimulopalpus angustivalvus Li, 2002
- Stimulopalpus baeoivalvus Li, 2002
- Stimulopalpus biocellatus Badonnel, 1949
- Stimulopalpus brunneus (New, 1975)
- Stimulopalpus changjiangicus Li, 1997
- Stimulopalpus cochleatus Li, 2002
- Stimulopalpus concinnus Li, 2002
- Stimulopalpus conflexus Li, 2002
- Stimulopalpus distinctus Smithers, 1995
- Stimulopalpus dolichogonus Li, 2002
- Stimulopalpus erromerus Li, 2002
- Stimulopalpus estipitatus Li, 2002
- Stimulopalpus exilis Li, 2002
- Stimulopalpus furcatus Li, 2002
- Stimulopalpus galactospilus Li, 2002
- Stimulopalpus heteroideus Li, 2002
- Stimulopalpus huashanensis Li, 2002
- Stimulopalpus immediatus Li, 2002
- Stimulopalpus introcurvus Li, 2002
- Stimulopalpus isoneurus Li, 2002
- Stimulopalpus japonicus Enderlein, 1906
- Stimulopalpus medifascus Li, 2002
- Stimulopalpus mimeticus Li, 1997
- Stimulopalpus peltatus Li, 2002
- Stimulopalpus pentospilus Li, 2002
- Stimulopalpus phaeospilus Li, 1999
- Stimulopalpus polychaetus Li, 2002
- Stimulopalpus psednopetalus Li, 2002
