= Platythyrea clypeata =

Scientific classification
- Kingdom: Animalia
- Phylum: Arthropoda
- Clade: Pancrustacea
- Class: Insecta
- Order: Hymenoptera
- Family: Formicidae
- Genus: Platythyrea
- Species: P. clypeata

Binomial name
- Platythyrea clypeata Forel, 1911

Synonyms
- Platythyrea thwaitesi Donisthorpe, 1931

Species of ant

Platythyrea clypeata is a species of ant of the subfamily Ponerinae. It is found in Sri Lanka, and China.
