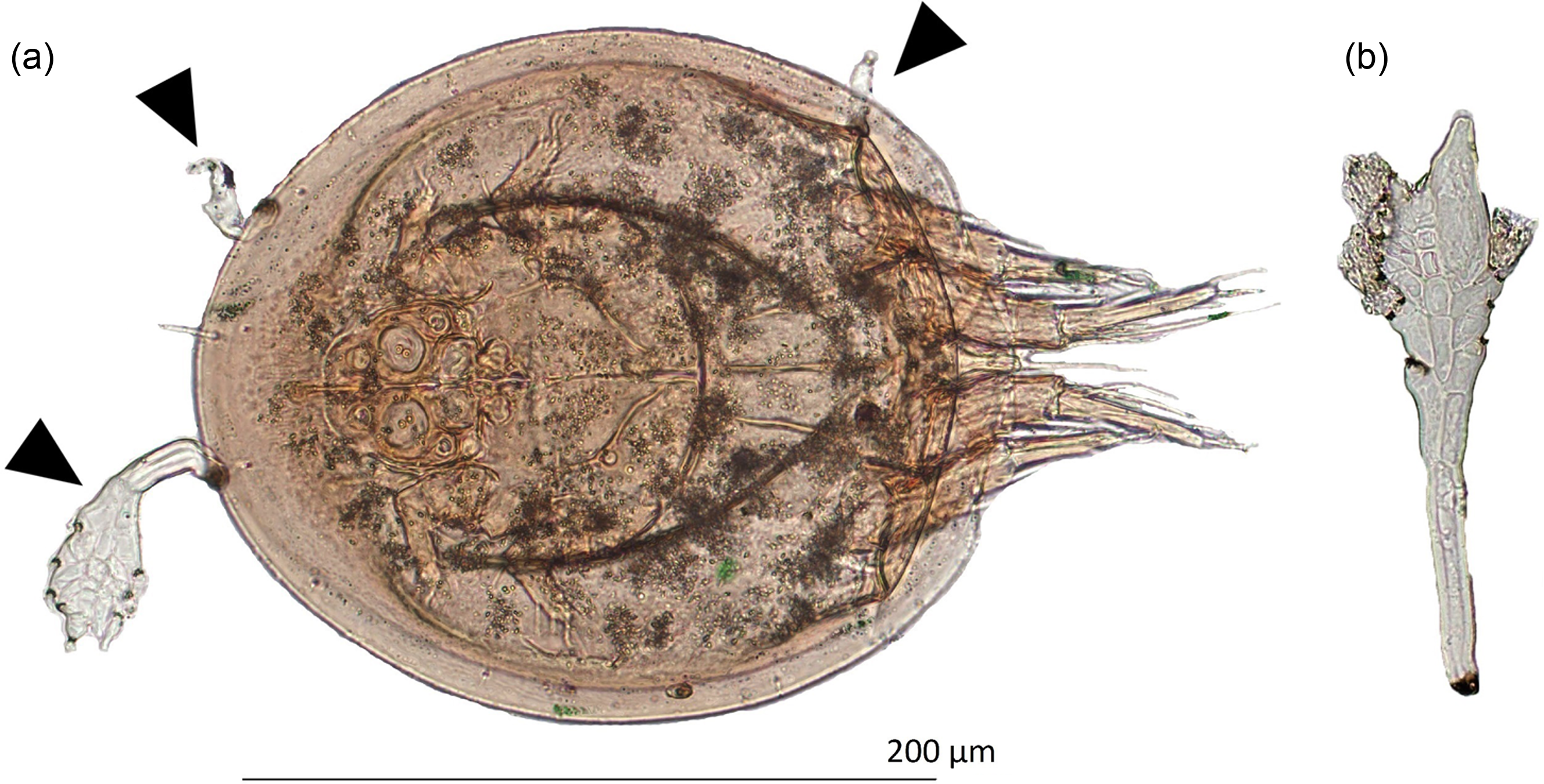
- Rickia wasmannii (a) on Acaridae deutonymph (b) on Myrmica scabrinodis

Scientific classification
- Kingdom: Fungi
- Division: Ascomycota
- Class: Laboulbeniomycetes
- Order: Laboulbeniales
- Family: Laboulbeniaceae
- Genus: Rickia
- Species: R. wasmannii

Binomial name
- Rickia wasmannii Cavara 1899

= Rickia wasmannii =

Species of fungus

Rickia wasmannii is a species of the widely distributed entomoparasitic order of fungi Laboulbeniales. It is an obligatory ectoparasite of ants of the genus Myrmica. The thalli penetrate outer layer of the cuticle, and appear on the host body surface. Little is known about its effect on the host ant, but it is usually regarded as a rather neutral symbiont. Contrarily, however, a recent study has documented an increased need of drinking water and a shortened life-span of infected ants.

The known host species of Rickia wasmannii are various Myrmica species, the most frequent being Myrmica scabrinodis. The fungus was reported from many European countries such as Austria, Bulgaria, the Czech Republic, France, Germany, Hungary, Italy, Luxembourg, Slovakia, Slovenia, Spain, Switzerland, and the United Kingdom.

In 2016, Pfiegler et al. showed that inquiline mites can become infected by R. wasmannii, which was thought to be restricted to the genus Myrmica (Hymenoptera: Formicidae). This was the first report of R. wasmannii from an alternative host in another subphylum (Chelicerata). These authors also found immature fruiting bodies on a larva of Microdon myrmicae (Diptera: Syrphidae), which represents the first report of any Rickia species on flies. Rickia wasmannii is thus capable of infecting alternative, unrelated host species as they co-occur in the ant nest “microhabitat”. The authors commented that the presence of R. wasmannii on inquilines in Myrmica ant nests suggests that the parasite may have adapted to the ant nest environment and is less dependent on acquiring specific nutrients from the hosts. However, they mentioned that the alternative cannot be excluded; these infections might also represent chance events if the fungus is incapable of fulfilling its life cycle.
