= Arrhenotoky =

Male-producing form of parthenogenesis

Honey bees produce haploid males from unfertilized eggs

Arrhenotoky (from Greek ἄρρην árrhēn "male" and τόκος tókos "birth"), also known as arrhenotokous parthenogenesis, is a form of parthenogenesis in which unfertilized eggs develop into males. In most cases, parthenogenesis produces exclusively female offspring, hence the distinction.

== Overview ==
The set of processes included under the term arrhenotoky depends on the author: arrhenotoky may be restricted to the production of males that are haploid (haplodiploidy); may include diploid males that permanently inactivate one set of chromosomes (parahaploidy); or may be used to cover all cases of males being produced by parthenogenesis (including such cases as aphids, where the males are XO diploids). The form of parthenogenesis in which females develop from unfertilized eggs is known as thelytoky; when both males and females develop from unfertilized eggs, the term "deuterotoky" is used.

In the most commonly used sense of the term, arrhenotoky is synonymous with haploid arrhenotoky or haplodiploidy: the production of haploid males from unfertilized eggs in insects having a haplodiploid sex-determination system. Males are produced parthenogenetically, while diploid females are usually (Note: Unless in certain rare cases they too are produced by thelytokous parthenogenesis.) produced biparentally from fertilized eggs. In a similar phenomenon, parthenogenetic diploid eggs develop into males by converting one set of their chromosomes to heterochromatin, thereby inactivating those chromosomes. This is referred to as diploid arrhenotoky or parahaploidy.

Arrhenotoky occurs in members of the insect order Hymenoptera (bees, ants, and wasps) and the Thysanoptera (thrips). The system also occurs sporadically in some spider mites, Hemiptera, Coleoptera (Micromalthus debilis, bark beetles), Scorpiones (Tityus metuendus) and rotifers.

== See also ==
- Apomixis
- Genomic imprinting
- Pseudo-arrhenotoky
- Thelytoky
