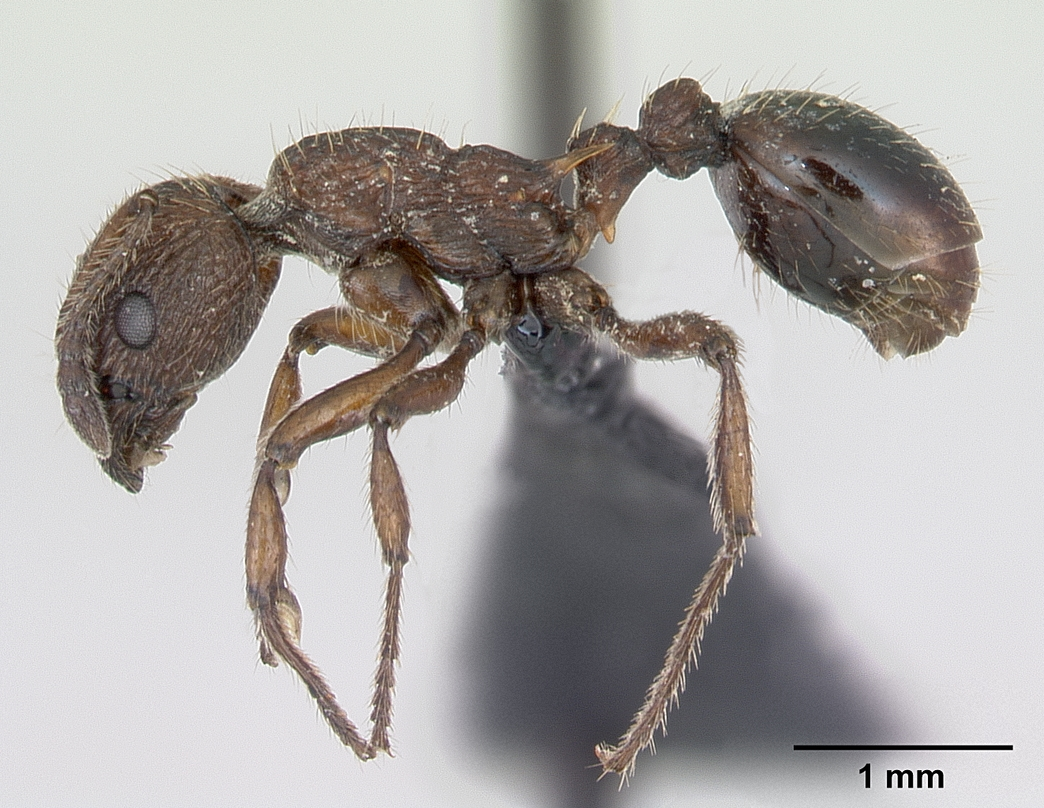
- worker

Scientific classification
- Kingdom: Animalia
- Phylum: Arthropoda
- Class: Insecta
- Order: Hymenoptera
- Family: Formicidae
- Subfamily: Myrmicinae
- Genus: Myrmica
- Species: M. scabrinodis

Binomial name
- Myrmica scabrinodis Nylander, 1846

= Myrmica scabrinodis =

Species of ant

Myrmica scabrinodis is a Euro-Siberian species of ant. It comes in a variety of forms that can be impossible to distinguish morphologically. As such, it has been suggested that the species is ongoing a major speciation event. Its colonies are monogynous or have only a few queens and may contain about 2500 workers. This ant species is the main host of the entomopathogenic fungus Rickia wasmannii. Phengaris caterpillars are primary threats of M. scabrinodis with specific species such as Phengaris arion developing a predatory relationship.

== Distribution and habitat ==
Myrmica scabrinodis is native to Europe and north-western Asia. It has also been introduced to North America, in coastal British Columbia and Washington (state), where it is considered an invasive species. It inhabits a wide variety of different environments, including dry grasslands, forests, bogs, and other wetlands. It builds nests in the ground, in grass or moss tussocks, under stones, and in rotten wood. In its introduced range, it is common in disturbed environments, including lawns and paved areas.

== Subspecies ==
- Myrmica scabrinodis scabrinodis
- Myrmica scabrinodis scabrinodosabuleti
