= Rickia =

Scientific classification
- Domain: Eukaryota
- Kingdom: Fungi
- Division: Ascomycota
- Class: Laboulbeniomycetes
- Order: Laboulbeniales
- Family: Laboulbeniaceae
- Genus: Rickia; Cavara

Type species
- Rickia wasmannii Cavara

Genus of fungi

Rickia is a genus of fungi in the family Laboulbeniaceae. The genus contain 132 species.

The genus name of Rickia is in honour of Johann Rick (known in Portuguese as João Evangelista Rick) (1869–1946), who was an Austrian-Brazilian teacher, clergyman and Botanist (Mycology). He taught Mathematics and Natural history between 1903-1915 at the Jesuit School in São Leopoldo, in Rio Grande do Sul in Brazil.

The genus was circumscribed by Fridiano Cavara in Malpighia vol.13 on page 182 in 1899.

== Species ==
As accepted by Species Fungorum;

- Rickia admirabilis Thaxt. (1926)
- Rickia africana Thaxt. (1926)
- Rickia aloisii W. Rossi (1990)
- Rickia ancylopi Thaxt. (1916)
- Rickia anomala Thaxt. (1912)
- Rickia anthribidicola W. Rossi & A. Weir (1996)
- Rickia apiculifera Thaxt. (1916)
- Rickia appendicifera Santam., Enghoff & Reboleira (2016)
- Rickia arachnoidea Thaxt. (1912)
- Rickia arcuata Thaxt. (1926)
- Rickia argentinensis Speg. (1917)
- Rickia arimensis Thaxt. (1926)
- Rickia aulachochiri Thaxt. (1926)
- Rickia berlesiana (Bacc.) Paoli (1911)
- Rickia bifida Thaxt. (1916)
- Rickia biseriata Thaxt. (1926)
- Rickia borneoensis K. Sugiy. & Hiroy. Yamam. (1982)
- Rickia candelabriformis Santam., Enghoff & Reboleira (2016)
- Rickia carpanetoi W. Rossi & Santam. (1992)
- Rickia celaenopsidis Thaxt. (1912)
- Rickia cifoneae W. Rossi & M. Bernardi (2018)
- Rickia circopis Thaxt. (1916)
- Rickia circumdata Thaxt. (1916)
- Rickia coelostomatis Thaxt. (1926)
- Rickia coleopterophagi Paoli (1911)
- Rickia compressa Thaxt. (1915)
- Rickia coprighis Speg. (1915)
- Rickia coptengalis Thaxt. (1915)
- Rickia cornuti Thaxt. (1916)
- Rickia corylophidorum A. Weir (1998)
- Rickia cristata Thaxt. (1912)
- Rickia danaealis Thaxt. (1916)
- Rickia dendroiuli W. Rossi (1977)
- Rickia depauperata Thaxt. (1916)
- Rickia dichotoma Thaxt. (1916)
- Rickia discopomae Thaxt. (1912)
- Rickia discreta Thaxt. (1912)
- Rickia dominicensis Thaxt. (1916)
- Rickia elegans Thaxt. (1912)
- Rickia elliptica Thaxt. (1912)
- Rickia encymonalis Thaxt. (1926)
- Rickia episcaphae Thaxt. (1916)
- Rickia episcaphulae Thaxt. (1916)
- Rickia eumorphi Thaxt. (1916)
- Rickia europsis Thaxt. (1916)
- Rickia euxesti Thaxt. (1916)
- Rickia euzerconalis Thaxt. (1912)
- Rickia excavata Thaxt. (1912)
- Rickia fainii Balazuc (1990)
- Rickia fastigiata Thaxt. (1926)
- Rickia filifera Thaxt. (1912)
- Rickia flagellifera Thaxt. (1926)
- Rickia furcata Thaxt. (1912)
- Rickia galatheae Santam., Enghoff & Reboleira (2016)
- Rickia georgii T. Majewski (1985)
- Rickia gigas Santam., Enghoff & Reboleira (2016)
- Rickia gracilis Thaxt. (1916)
- Rickia gryllotalpae Thaxt. (1916)
- Rickia haytiensis Thaxt. (1926)
- Rickia huggertii Balazuc (1980)
- Rickia hyalina Thaxt. (1926)
- Rickia hyperborea Balazuc (1988)
- Rickia hypoaspidis Thaxt. (1916)
- Rickia inclinata Thaxt. (1912)
- Rickia inclusa Thaxt. (1916)
- Rickia introversa Thaxt. (1916)
- Rickia jacobsonii Speg. (1915)
- Rickia javanica Paoli (1911)
- Rickia kamerunana Thaxt. (1912)
- Rickia kawasakii Ishik. (1966)
- Rickia kistneri W. Rossi (1991)
- Rickia laboulbenioides De Kesel (2013)
- Rickia latior Thaxt. (1916)
- Rickia lenoirii Santam. (2014)
- Rickia leonis W. Rossi (1978)
- Rickia leptaulacis Thaxt. (1926)
- Rickia lophophora Santam., Enghoff & Reboleira (2016)
- Rickia lordithonis T. Majewski & K. Sugiy. (1985)
- Rickia lycopodinae Thaxt. (1916)
- Rickia macrandra Thaxt. (1926)
- Rickia macrochelis Thaxt. (1926)
- Rickia mamillata A. Weir (1998)
- Rickia megisthani Thaxt. (1912)
- Rickia minuta Paoli (1911)
- Rickia minutissima K. Sugiy. & Hiroy. Yamam. (1982)
- Rickia mycetinae Sugiy. (1973)
- Rickia nephanis Scheloske (1969)
- Rickia nigella Sugiy. (1978)
- Rickia nigrescens Thaxt. (1916)
- Rickia nigriceps Thaxt. (1926)
- Rickia nigrofimbriata Thaxt. (1916)
- Rickia nipponensis Ishik. (1966)
- Rickia nutans Thaxt. (1915)
- Rickia obcordata Thaxt. (1912)
- Rickia obelostrepti Santam., Enghoff & Reboleira (2016)
- Rickia oceana Sugiy. (1978)
- Rickia odontopygidarum Santam., Enghoff & Reboleira (2016)
- Rickia onthophagi Thaxt. (1915)
- Rickia pachyiuli M. Bechet & I. Bechet (1986)
- Rickia pachylaelapis T. Majewski (1981)
- Rickia pallescens Thaxt. (1916)
- Rickia pallida Thaxt. (1916)
- Rickia pallodina Thaxt. (1926)
- Rickia papuana Thaxt. (1916)
- Rickia parasiti Thaxt. (1916)
- Rickia parvula Thaxt. (1916)
- Rickia passalina Thaxt. (1916)
- Rickia perlata Thaxt. (1926)
- Rickia peyerimhoffii Maire (1916)
- Rickia phalacri Thaxt. (1916)
- Rickia phloeonomi Thaxt. (1926)
- Rickia pinnata Thaxt. (1917)
- Rickia platessa Santam., Enghoff & Reboleira (2016)
- Rickia pocadii A. Weir (1998)
- Rickia polonica T. Majewski (1974)
- Rickia proliferans Thaxt. (1926)
- Rickia proteini T. Majewski (1985)
- Rickia ptiliidarum T. Majewski (1981)
- Rickia pulchra Thaxt. (1912)
- Rickia radiata Thaxt. (1916)
- Rickia rhacomycoides Speg. (1917)
- Rickia rhynchophora Santam., Enghoff & Reboleira (2016)
- Rickia rostellata Thaxt. (1926)
- Rickia rostrata Thaxt. (1915)
- Rickia rotundata Thaxt. (1926)
- Rickia sakaii T. Majewski & K. Sugiy. (1985)
- Rickia sakkae K. Sugiy. & T. Majewski (1985)
- Rickia sarawakensis Thaxt. (1916)
- Rickia saulae Thaxt. (1916)
- Rickia scydmaeni Thaxt. (1916)
- Rickia serrulata A. Weir (1998)
- Rickia seticola Thaxt. (1926)
- Rickia setifera Thaxt. (1926)
- Rickia siddhartha Balazuc (1977)
- Rickia silvestrii Speg. (1915)
- Rickia spathulata Thaxt. (1912)
- Rickia sphindidorum A. Weir (1998)
- Rickia stellata T. Majewski (1986)
- Rickia stenotarsi Thaxt. (1916)
- Rickia sugiyamae I.I. Tav. (1985)
- Rickia tachini Terada (1980)
- Rickia taiwanensis Terada (1978)
- Rickia tessellata Thaxt. (1926)
- Rickia tomari Thaxt. (1915)
- Rickia trichophora Thaxt. (1926)
- Rickia trinitatis Thaxt. (1926)
- Rickia uncigeri Scheloske (1969)
- Rickia uncinata Thaxt. (1915)
- Rickia uropodae Thaxt. (1915)
- Rickia wasmannii Cavara (1899)
- Rickia wulaiensis Sugiy. (1978)
- Rickia yoshii K. Sugiy. & Hiroy. Yamam. (1982)
- Rickia zanettii W. Rossi & Cesari (1978)

== Former species ==
Moved species still within the Laboulbeniaceae family;

- R. formicicola Speg. (1917) now Dimorphomyces formicicola
- R. lispini Thaxt. (1912) = Diaphoromyces lispini
- R. lispini K. Sugiy. (1973) = Rickia sugiyamae
- R. marginata Thaxt. (1915) = Diaphoromyces marginatus
- R. megisthani var. trachyuropodae Thaxt. (1912) = Rickia megisthani
- R. melanophthalmae Thaxt. (1912) = Benjaminiomyces melanophthalmae
- R. perpusilla Speg. (1917) = Benjaminiomyces perpusillus
- R. platensis Speg. (1917) = Benjaminiomyces platensis
- R. pumila Speg. (1917) = Benjaminiomyces pumilus
- R. zirophori Thaxt. (1916 = Diaphoromyces zirophori
