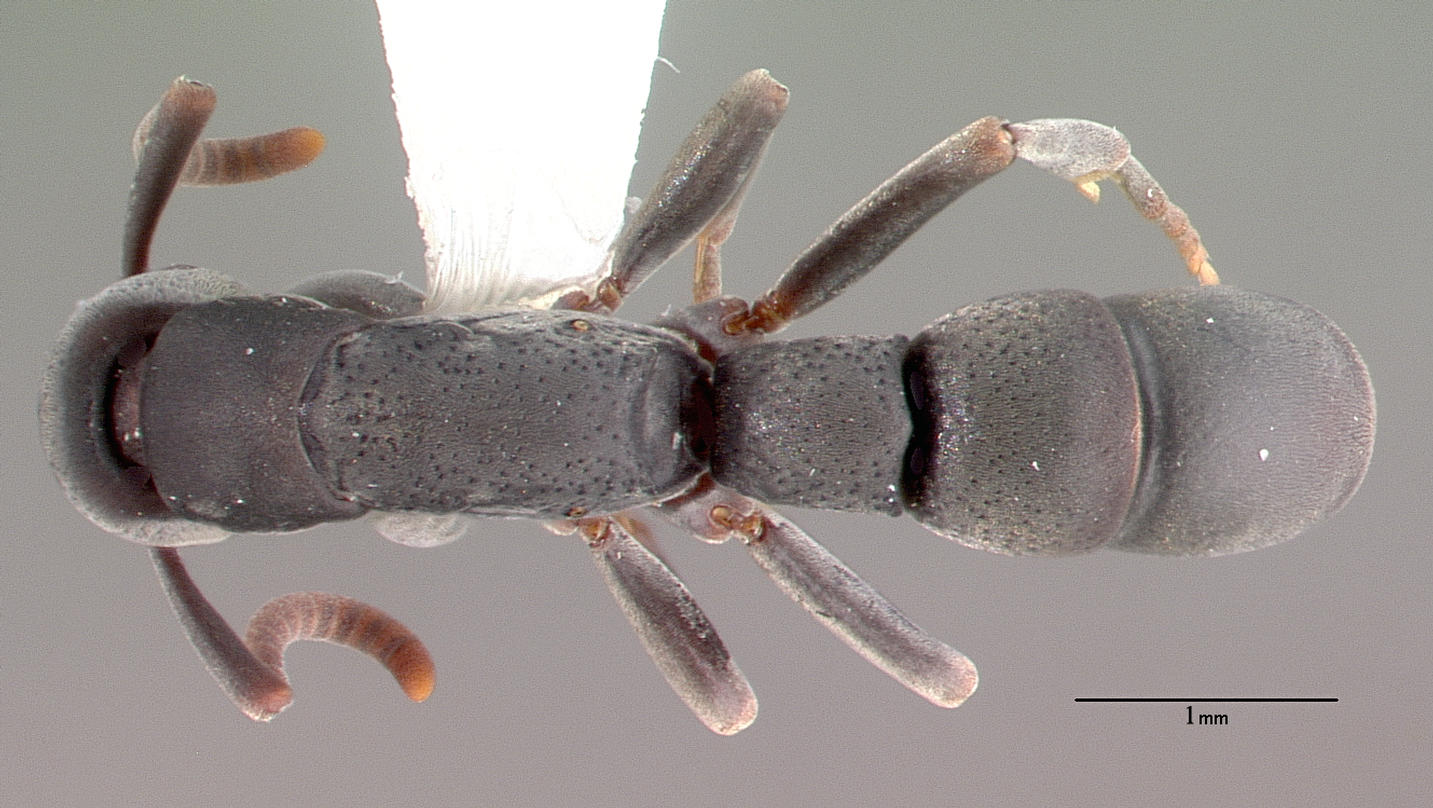
- Dorsal view of Platythyrea punctata specimen

Scientific classification
- Domain: Eukaryota
- Kingdom: Animalia
- Phylum: Arthropoda
- Class: Insecta
- Order: Hymenoptera
- Family: Formicidae
- Genus: Platythyrea
- Species: P. punctata

Binomial name
- Platythyrea punctata (Smith, 1858)

= Platythyrea punctata =

Species of ant

Platythyrea punctata is a species of ant in the family Formicidae.
