= Thelytoky =

Type of parthenogenesis

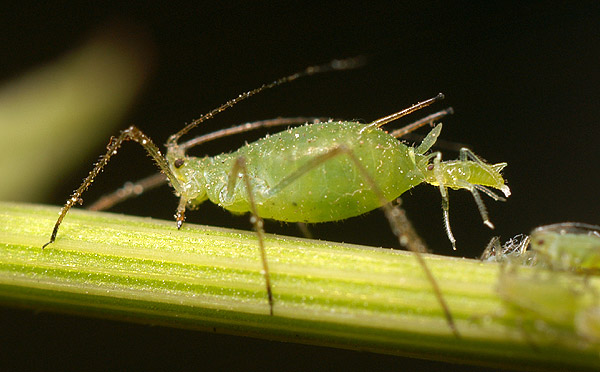
Aphid giving birth by parthenogenesis, the live young growing from unfertilized eggs

Thelytoky (from the Greek θῆλυς thēlys "female" and τόκος tókos "birth"), a type of parthenogenesis, is the absence of mating and subsequent production of all female diploid offspring. Thelytokous parthenogenesis is rare among animals and reported in about 1,500 species, about 1 in 1000 of described animal species, according to a 1984 study. It is more common in invertebrates, like arthropods, but it can occur in vertebrates, including salamanders, fish, and reptiles such as some whiptail lizards.

Thelytoky can occur by different mechanisms, each of which has a different impact on the level of homozygosity. It is found in several groups of Hymenoptera, including Apidae, Aphelinidae, Cynipidae, Formicidae, Ichneumonidae, and Tenthredinidae. It can be induced in Hymenoptera by the bacteria Wolbachia and Cardinium.

== Advantages of thelytoky ==
Species may encounter a few advantages employing this form of mating system. Thelytoky allows females to pass along genotypes that ensure success in that particular environment, having only daughters increases the species output, and energy that would otherwise be exerted into finding or attracting a mate can directly be invested in reproduction.

Thelytoky can occur naturally, or it can be induced by scientists in a laboratory setting. In some species, thelytoky can also occur through the fusion of two female gametes.

=== Types of thelytoky ===
Facultative thelytoky refers to an individual being capable of reproducing sexually or asexually depending on environmental conditions. For example, smalltooth sawfish in Florida populations can be facultatively thelytokous, meaning that they will reproduce sexually when conditions are favorable, but switch to thelytoky when resources and mates become scarce.

Accidental thelytoky occurs when a female organism produces offspring asexually due to the absence or failure of fertilization by a male. This can occur in species that normally reproduce sexually but are unable to find a mate, or in species in which mating is unsuccessful due to physical or behavioral barriers. While accidental thelytoky can provide a short-term reproductive solution in the absence of a mate, it is typically not sustainable over the long-term due to the loss of genetic diversity.

Cyclical thelytoky is a form of thelytoky in which organisms alternate between sexual and asexual reproduction in a regular cycle. This type of reproduction is seen in cynipid gall wasps, in which sexual reproduction occurs in alternate generations. The asexual reproduction that occurs in between these sexual generations is typically facilitated by the presence of specific environmental cues, such as temperature or photoperiod. The genetic diversity generated by sexual reproduction in these organisms is thought to play an important role in their ability to adapt to changing environmental conditions.

Obligate thelytoky refers to a form of asexual reproduction in which an individual is unable to reproduce sexually and must rely on asexual reproduction for reproduction. Species that are obligately thelytokous do not have the genetic or physiological mechanisms necessary to produce males, and thus rely solely on female offspring to perpetuate their lineage. Examples of obligately thelytokous species include some members of cerapachys ants and some species of whiptail lizards.

== Arrhenotoky and thelytoky in Hymenoptera ==
Honeybees produce haploid males from unfertilized eggs (arrhenotoky).

Hymenoptera (ants, bees, wasps, and sawflies) have a haplodiploid sex-determination system. They produce haploid males from unfertilized eggs (arrhenotoky), a form of parthenogenesis. However, in a few social hymenopterans, queens or workers are capable of producing diploid female offspring by thelytoky. The daughters produced may or may not be complete clones of their mother depending on the type of parthenogenesis that takes place. The offspring can develop into either queens or workers. Examples of such species include the Cape bee, Apis mellifera capensis, Mycocepurus smithii and clonal raider ant, Ooceraea biroi.

== Automixis ==
The effects of central fusion and terminal fusion on heterozygosity

Automixis is a form of thelytoky. In automictic parthenogenesis, meiosis takes place and diploidy is restored by fusion of first division non-sister nuclei (central fusion) or the second division sister nuclei (terminal fusion). (see diagram).

=== With central fusion ===
Automixis with central fusion tends to maintain heterozygosity in the passage of the genome from mother to daughter. This form of automixis has been observed in several ant species including the desert ant Cataglyphis cursor, the clonal raider ant Cerapachys biroi, the predaceous ant Platythyrea punctata, and the electric ant (little fire ant) Wasmannia auropunctata. Automixis with central fusion also occurs in the Cape honey bee Apis mellifera capensis, the brine shrimp Artemia parthenogenetica, and the termite Embiratermes neotenicus.

Oocytes that undergo automixis with central fusion often display a reduced rate of crossover recombination. A low rate of recombination in automictic oocytes favors maintenance of heterozygosity, and only a slow transition from heterozygosity to homozygosity over successive generations. This allows avoidance of immediate inbreeding depression. Species that display central fusion with reduced recombination include the ants P. punctata and W. auropunctata, the brine shrimp A. parthenogenetica, and the honey bee A. m. capensis. In A. m. capensis, the recombination rate during the meiosis associated with thelytokous parthenogenesis is reduced by more than 10-fold. In W. auropunctata the reduction is 45-fold.

Single queen colonies of the narrow headed ant Formica exsecta provide an illustrative example of the possible deleterious effects of increased homozygosity. In this ant the level of queen homozygosity is negatively associated with colony age. Reduced colony survival appears to be due to decreased queen lifespan resulting from queen homozygosity and expression of deleterious recessive mutations (inbreeding depression).

=== With terminal fusion ===
Automixis with terminal fusion tends to promote homozygosity in the passage of the genome from mother to daughter. This form of automixis has been observed in the water flea Daphnia magna and the Colombian rainbow boa constrictor Epicrates maurus. Parthenogenesis in E. maurus is only the third genetically confirmed case of consecutive virgin births of viable offspring from a single female within any vertebrate lineage. However, survival of offspring over two successive litters was poor, suggesting that automixis with terminal fusion leads to homozygosity and expression of deleterious recessive alleles (inbreeding depression).

== See also ==
- Autotoky
- Epitoky
- Arrhenotoky
