= Janko de Beer =

South African sculptor (born 1980)

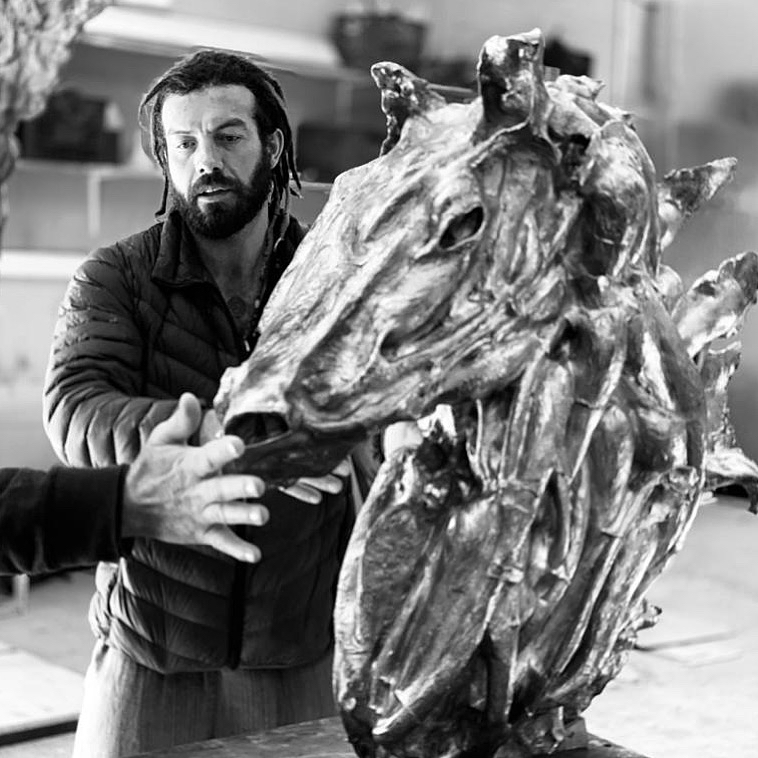
- Born: February 24, 1980 (age 46); Pretoria, South Africa
- Known for: Sculptor, visual artist

Janko de Beer (born February 24, 1980) is a South African sculptor and visual artist, based in Pringle Bay, South Africa.

== Career ==
De Beer obtained his law degree (LLB) in 2003 and practiced as an Advocate of the High Court of South Africa for 12 years. In 2005, De Beer started his career as a sculptor. In 2010, he had his first solo sculpture exhibition in Cape Town at Long Street Gallery. In 2014, he landed exhibition space in his first group show at Cape Town's Youngblood Gallery. The natural shapes and textures of dried-out bull kelp collected from various beaches around South Africa inspire his current work. Over the years, He participated in many group exhibitions.

== Selected artworks ==
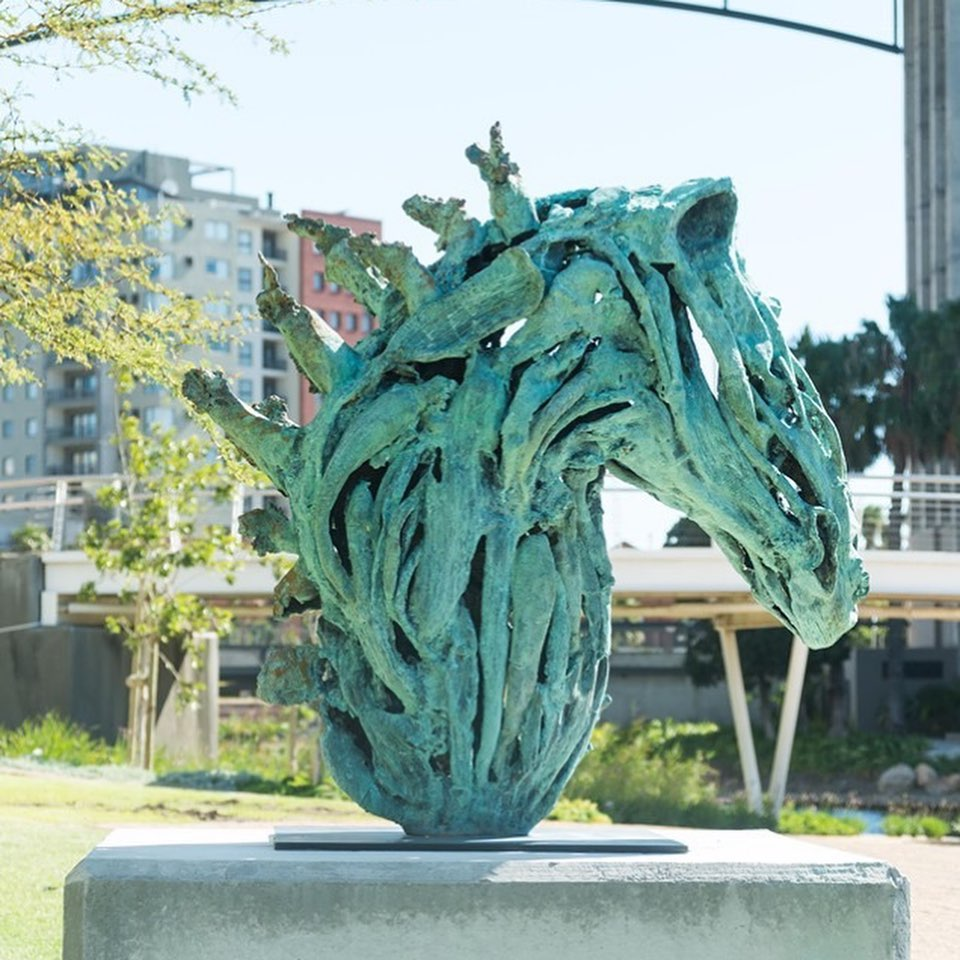
Sanctified, Century City Art Trail, Cape Town, SA

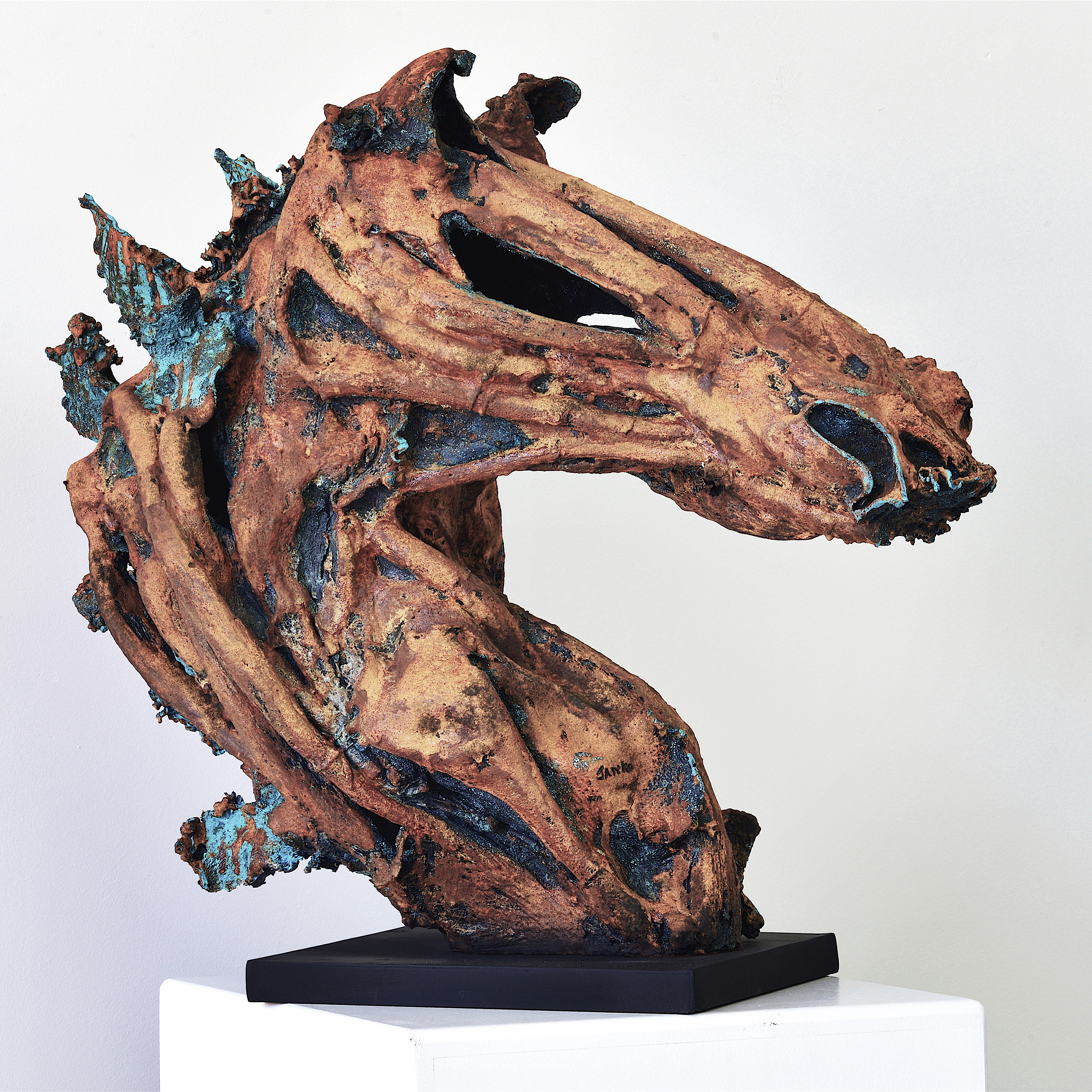
Mischief a horse bust sculpture by Janko De Beer

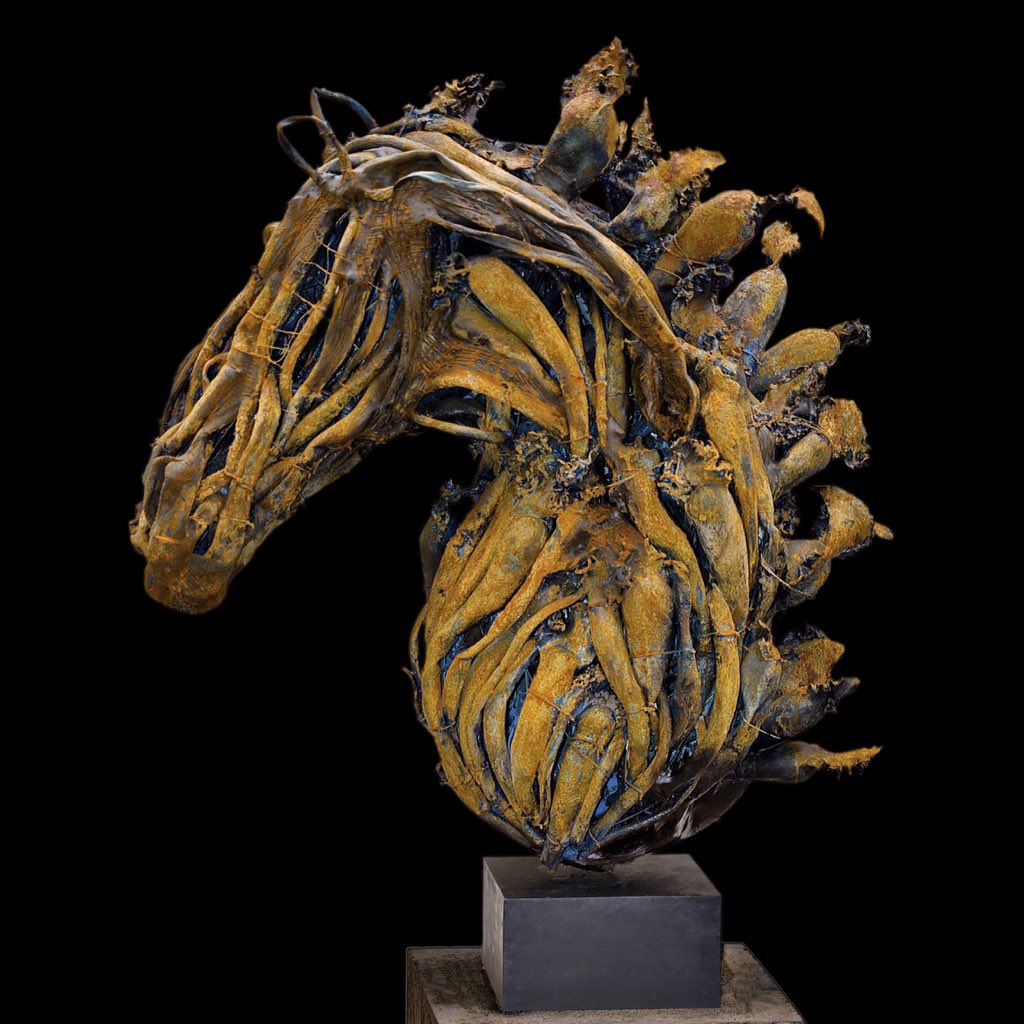
Mysticism by Janko de Beer

2021

- Metamorphosis, Creation Wine Estate, Hermanus, SA
- Solo exhibition, Denzil's & Jo, Johannesburg, South Africa
- Motion Bandits (skateboard art benefitting ladles of love), Galleryone11, Cape Town, SA

2020

- Klein Karoo Nasionale Kunstefees, Oudtshoorn, SA
- Hermanus FynKuns, Hermanus, SA

2018

- The Turbine Art Fair (TAF), S Gallery, Johannesburg, SA
- Bespoke Art Auction, Little Angels, Idiom Wine Estate, Cape Town, SA
- Dennis Goldberg Art Auction, S Gallery, Johannesburg, SA
- First Thursday Group Exhibition, Youngblood Gallery, Cape Town, SA
- Group exhibition, RED Gallery, Constantia, SA

2016

- Solo exhibition, ODA Gallery, Franschhoek, SA
- Group exhibition, S Gallery, Houtbay, SA

2015

- Nature, group exhibition, Oude Libertas Gallery, Stellenbosch, SA
- Horse, group exhibition, Oude Libertas Gallery, Stellenbosch, SA
- The Nature of Art, group exhibition, ABSA KKNK, Oudshoorn, SA

2014

- Equus exhibition, Cavalli Estate, Somerset West, SA
- First Thursday Group Exhibition, Youngblood Gallery, Cape Town, SA
- Group exhibition, Youngblood Gallery, Cape Town, SA

2010

- Solo exhibition, Long Street Gallery, Cape Town, SA

2008

- Group exhibition, Artapart Gallery, Muizenberg, SA

2007

- Group exhibition, Breytenbach Gallery, Wellington, SA

2006

- Group exhibition, Drop Street Theatre Gallery, Stellenboch, SA
