= Autotoky =

Autotoky is uniparental reproduction by self-fertilization or by parthenogenesis. The word comes from the Greek words auto meaning self and tokos meaning birth. Plants that reproduce by parthenogenesis usually do so by apomixis, a process that retains meiosis. Animals that reproduce by parthenogenesis usually use automixis, another process that retains meiosis. The elements of meiosis that are retained in these reproductive systems are (1) pairing of homologous chromosomes, (2) DNA double-strand break formation, and (3) recombinational repair at prophase I. The adaptive function of meiosis that is retained in these forms of autotoky appears to be repair of DNA damage.
