= Cryptandromyces =

Scientific classification
- Kingdom: Fungi
- Division: Ascomycota
- Class: Laboulbeniomycetes
- Order: Laboulbeniales
- Family: Laboulbeniaceae
- Genus: Cryptandromyces; Thaxt.

Type species
- Cryptandromyces geniculatus Thaxt.

Species
- Cryptandromyces batrisi (Thaxt.) I.I. Tav. 1985; Cryptandromyces batrisoceni (Thaxt.) I.I. Tav. 1985; Cryptandromyces bialowiezensis T. Majewski 1999; Cryptandromyces bibloplecti T. Majewski 1990; Cryptandromyces brachyglutae J. Siemaszko & Siemaszko 1928; Cryptandromyces bryaxidis T. Majewski 1999; Cryptandromyces cauliculatus (Thaxt.) I.I. Tav. 1985; Cryptandromyces elegans (Maire) W. Rossi & D. Castaldo 2004; Cryptandromyces euplecti Santam. 2001; Cryptandromyces geniculatus Thaxt. 1912; Cryptandromyces incurvatus (Thaxt.) I.I. Tav. 1985; Cryptandromyces isabellae W. Rossi 1990; Cryptandromyces javanus Thaxt. 1915; Cryptandromyces laboulbenioides (Thaxt.) I.I. Tav. 1985; Cryptandromyces nigromarginatus (Thaxt.) I.I. Tav. 1985; Cryptandromyces peyerimhoffii Maire 1920; Cryptandromyces sarawakensis (Thaxt.) I.I. Tav. 1985; Cryptandromyces scydmaenarius (Thaxt.) I.I. Tav. 1985; Cryptandromyces scydmaenicola (Speg.) I.I. Tav. 1985; Cryptandromyces subgaleatus Thaxt. 1915; Cryptandromyces zethopsi (Thaxt.) I.I. Tav. 1985

Genus of fungi

Cryptandromyces is a genus of fungi in the family Laboulbeniaceae. The genus contains 13 or 19 species.
