= Cryptandromyces elegans =

Scientific classification
- Kingdom: Fungi
- Division: Ascomycota
- Class: Laboulbeniomycetes
- Order: Laboulbeniales
- Family: Laboulbeniaceae
- Genus: Cryptandromyces
- Species: C. elegans

Binomial name
- Cryptandromyces elegans (Maire) W.Rossi & D.Castaldo (2004)

Synonyms
- Peyerimhoffiella elegans Maire (1916)

Species of fungus

Cryptandromyces elegans is a species of fungus in the family Laboulbeniaceae. It is found in the Netherlands.
