= Chitonomyces =

Scientific classification
- Kingdom: Fungi
- Division: Ascomycota
- Class: Laboulbeniomycetes
- Order: Laboulbeniales
- Family: Laboulbeniaceae
- Genus: Chitonomyces; Peyr.

Type species
- Chitonomyces melanurus Peyr.

Species
- 98 species, including: Chitonomyces elegans

Genus of fungi

Chitonomyces is a genus of fungi in the family Laboulbeniaceae. The genus contain 98 species.
