= Chitonomyces elegans =

Scientific classification
- Kingdom: Fungi
- Division: Ascomycota
- Class: Laboulbeniomycetes
- Order: Laboulbeniales
- Family: Laboulbeniaceae
- Genus: Chitonomyces
- Species: C. elegans

Binomial name
- Chitonomyces elegans Thaxt., 1926

Species of fungus

Chitonomyces elegans is a species of fungus in the family Laboulbeniaceae.
