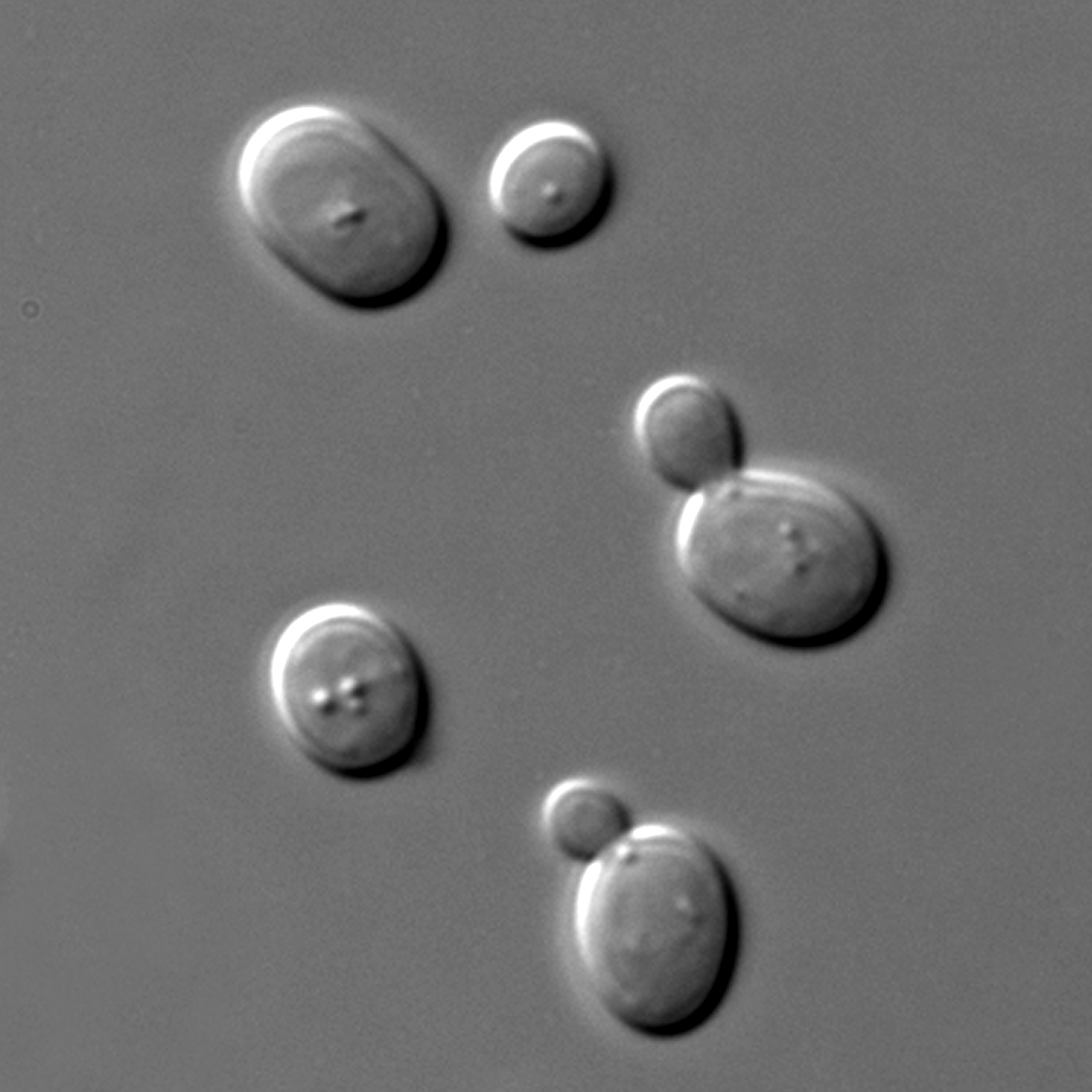
- Yeast of the species Saccharomyces cerevisiae
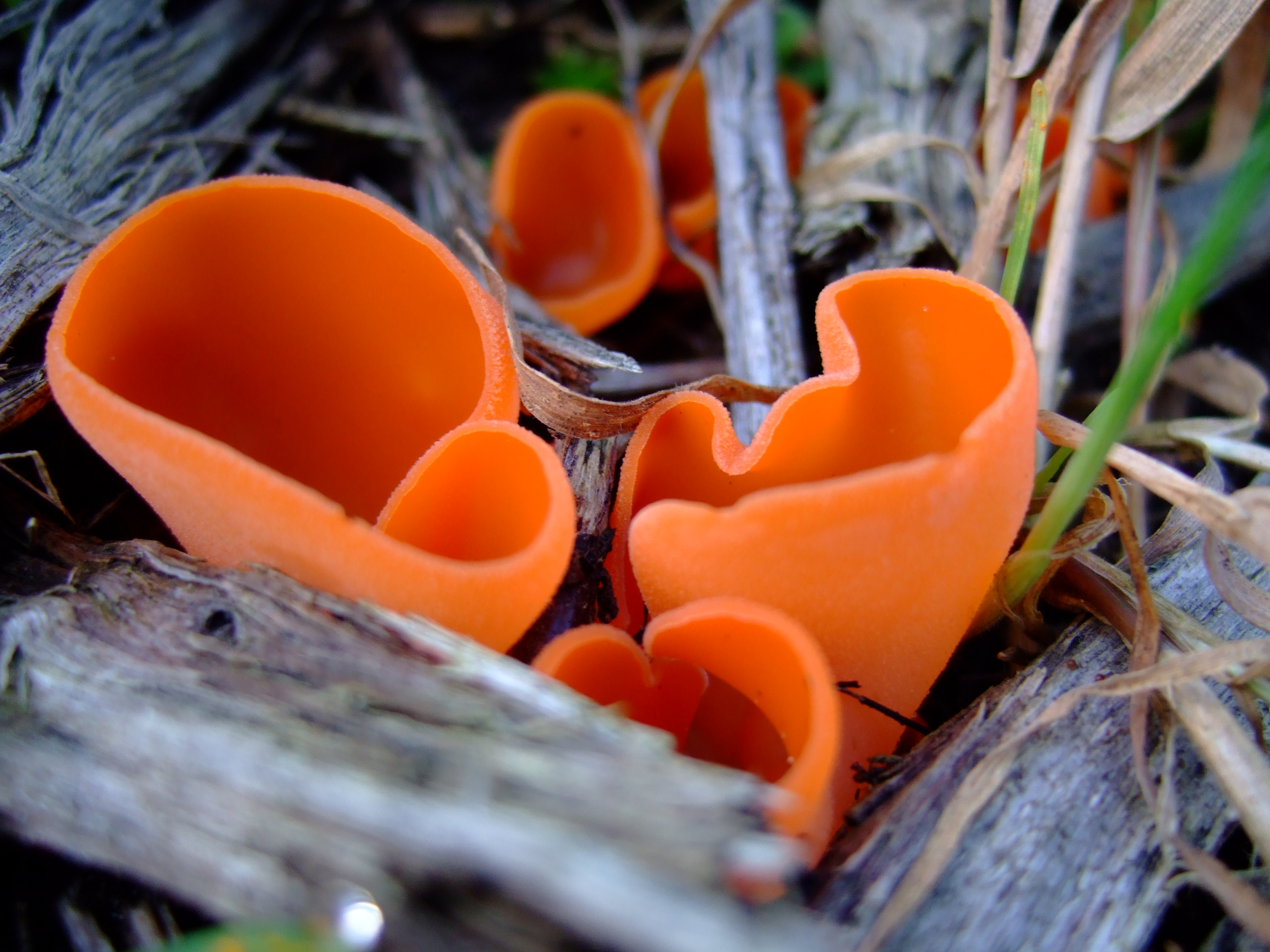
- Aleuria aurantia

Scientific classification
- Kingdom: Fungi
- Division: Ascomycota
- Clade: Saccharomyceta

Subdivisions and classes
- Saccharomycotina Pezizomycotina

= Saccharomyceta =

Clade of fungi

Saccharomyceta is a clade of fungi containing Pezizomycotina and Saccharomycotina, or all Ascomycete fungi except Taphrinomycotina according to the 2007 fungal phylogeny "The Mycota: A Comprehensive Treatise on Fungi as Experimental Systems for Basic and Applied Research" and Tedersoo et al. 2018.

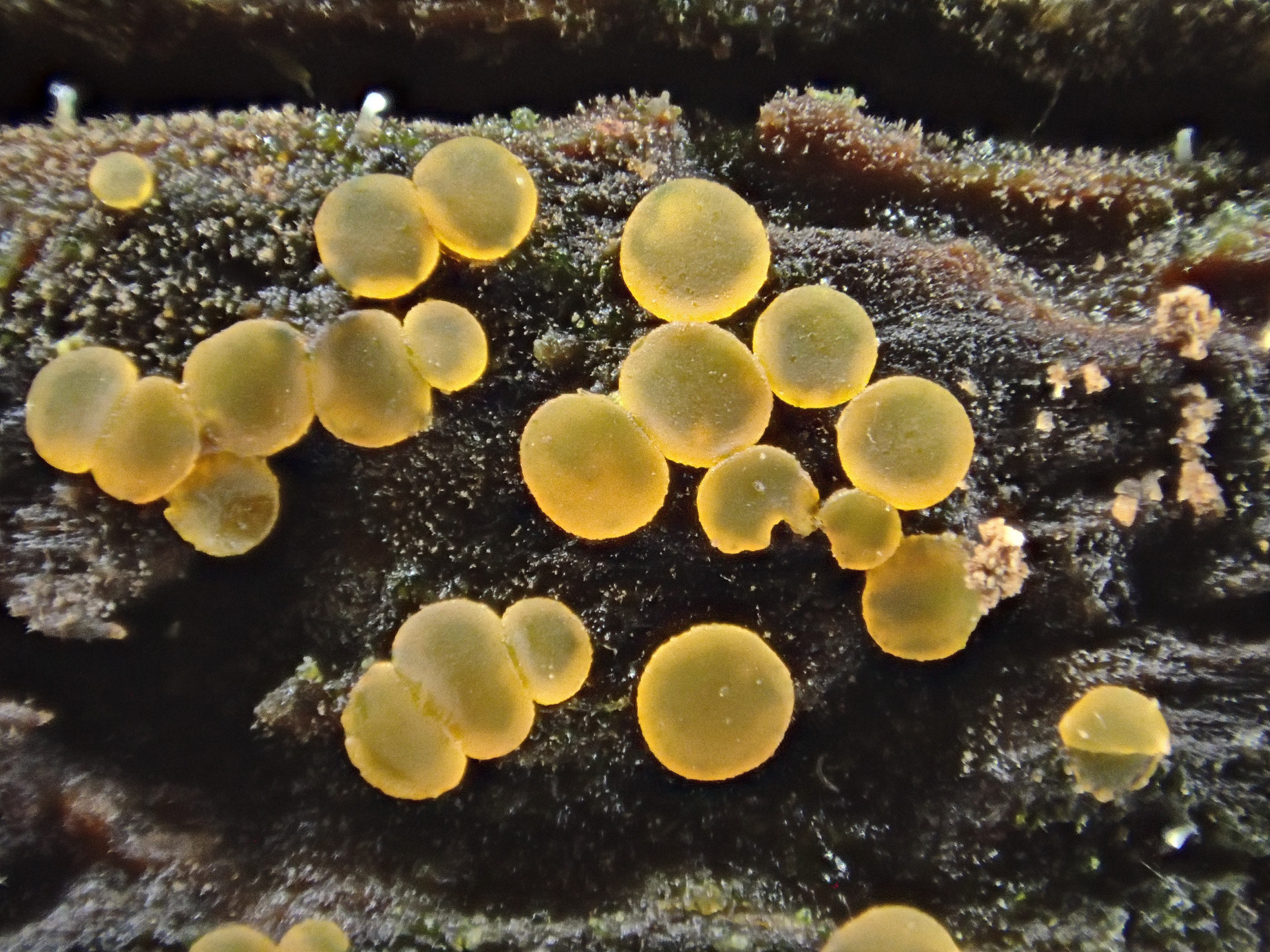
Orbilia xanthostigma

- Ascomycota
  - Taphrinomycotina
    - - Neolectomycetes
      - Taphrinomycetes
    - Schizosaccharomyceta
      - Archaeorhizomycetes
      - - Pneumocystidomycetes
        - Schizosaccharomycetes
  - Saccharomyceta
    - Saccharomycotina
      Saccharomycetes
    - Pezizomycotina
      - ?Thelocarpales
      - ?Vezdaeales
      - ?Lahmiales
      - ?Triblidiales
      - Orbiliomycetes
      - - Pezizomycetes
        - Leotiomyceta
          - Sordariomyceta
            - Xylonomycetes
            - - Geoglossomycetes
              - - Leotiomycetes
                - - Laboulbeniomycetes
                  - Sordariomycetes
          - Dothideomyceta
            - - Coniocybomycetes
              - Lichinomycetes
            - - - Eurotiomycetes
                - Lecanoromycetes
              - - Collemopsidiomycetes
                - - Arthoniomycetes
                  - Dothideomycetes

== See also ==
- Ascomycota
