= Fusoma =

Scientific classification
- Kingdom: Fungi
- Division: Ascomycota
- Subdivision: Pezizomycotina
- Genus: Fusoma; Corda

Genus of fungi

Fusoma is a genus of fungi with unknown classification.

The genus was first described by Corda in 1837.

The species of this genus are found in Europe and Northern America.

Species:

- Fusoma biseptatum
- Fusoma heraclei
- Fusoma parasiticum
