= Symbiotaphrina =

Scientific classification
- Kingdom: Fungi
- Division: Ascomycota
- Class: Xylonomycetes
- Order: Symbiotaphrinales
- Family: Symbiotaphrinaceae
- Genus: Symbiotaphrina; Kühlw. & Jurzitza ex W.Gams & Arx (1980)

Type species
- Symbiotaphrina buchneri Gräbner ex W.Gams & Arx (1980)

Genus of fungi

Symbiotaphrina is a genus including seven species of fungi in the monotypic family Symbiotaphrinaceae Baral & E. Weber and the monotypic order Symbiotaphrinales Baral & E. Weber.

The family and order were published in 2018 to contain the genus.

== Taxonomy ==
Sexual states of Symbiotaphrina species (formerly included in the discomycete genus Tromeropsis) are black disk-shaped apothecia with multi-spored asci, and one-celled, unpigmented ascospores. The apothecia can be revived for several years after they have been dry.

The asexual states of Symbiotraphrina species are yeast-like endosymbionts of Anobiid beetles (e.g. the cigarette beetle Lasioderma and the related Stegobium). The ellipsoidal yeast cells have monopolar budding. A few species also have mycelial asexual states with conidium-producing pores ("phialides") in somatic hyphae.

== Ecology and physiology ==
Symbiotaphrina species can be found on dry, decayed wood. A few live in Anobiid beetles in a specialized structure (a "mycetome") between the fore- and mid-gut. Cells are transmitted between host generations when adults rub them onto egg surfaces eaten by hatched larvae. These fungi assist beetles with B-vitamin biosynthesis, fatty acid and sterol metabolism, and break down flavonoids and other toxins.

Symbiotic Symbiotaphrina species can be isolated in axenic culture by aseptically dissecting beetle guts, spreading them onto agar, with incubation at 26 °C (79 °F).

== Species ==
As accepted by Species Fungorum;

- Symbiotaphrina buchneri Gräbner ex W.Gams & Arx (1980)
- Symbiotaphrina desertorum Baral, G.Marson, E.Weber & Quijada (2017)
- Symbiotaphrina kochii Jurzitza ex W.Gams & Arx (1980)
- Symbiotaphrina larreae Baral, G.Marson & E. Weber (2017)
- Symbiotaphrina lignicola (L.J.Hutchison, Sigler & Y.Hirats.) E.Weber & Baral (2017)
- Symbiotaphrina microtheca (P.Karst.) Baral, E.Weber & G.Marson (2017)
- Symbiotaphrina sanguinea (C.Ramírez) Baral & E.Weber (2017)
