= Paleopyrenomycites =

Paleopyrenomycites Temporal range: Pragian

Scientific classification
- Kingdom: Fungi
- Division: Ascomycota
- Genus: †Paleopyrenomycites
- Species: †P. devonicus

Binomial name
- †Paleopyrenomycites devonicus Taylor, Hass, Kerp, Krings et Hanlin 2005

Genus of fungi

Paleopyrenomycites is a Devonian genus of fungus of uncertain phylogenetic affinity within the Pezizomycotina total group, known from the Rhynie chert.

== History ==
Paleopyrenomycites dates back over 400 million years to the Early Devonian period, and represent one of the oldest known ascomycetes. Their discovery within the Rhynie chert provides critical evidence for the early diversification of fungi, highlighting their ecological roles in decomposition.
