= Pezizomycotina =

Pezizomycotina Temporal range: Pragian–recent
- Clockwise from top left: Morchella esculenta (yellow morel); Sarcoscypha austriaca (scarlet elfcup); Xylaria hypoxylon (candlestick fungus); Cyttaria espinosae (lihueñe); Penicillium notatum; Normandina pulchella (elf ears lichen); Candelariella vitellina (common goldspeck lichen); and Peltigera malacea (veinless pelt lichen)

Scientific classification
- Kingdom: Fungi
- Division: Ascomycota
- Clade: Saccharomyceta
- Subdivision: Pezizomycotina; O.E. Erikss. & Winka 1997

Classes and orders
- Geoglossomycetes; Leotiomyceta; Arthoniomycetes; Collemopsidiomycetes; Coniocybomycetes; Dothideomycetes; Eurotiomycetes; Geoglossomycetes; Laboulbeniomycetes; Lecanoromycetes; Leotiomycetes; Lichinomycetes; Sordariomycetes; Xylonomycetes; Orbiliomycetes; Pezizomycetes; Xylobotryomycetes; incertae sedis (no class); Lahmiales Medeolariales Triblidiales Vezdaeales Thelocarpales Harpidiaceae

Subdivision of fungi

Pezizomycotina is the largest subdivision of Ascomycota, containing the filamentous ascomycetes and most lichenized fungi. It is more or less synonymous with the older taxon Euascomycota. These fungi reproduce by fission rather than budding. This subdivision includes almost all ascus fungi that have fruiting bodies visible to the naked eye, except for the genus Neolecta, which belongs to Taphrinomycotina.

See the taxobox for a list of the classes that make up the Pezizomycotina. The old class Loculoascomycetes (consisting of all the bitunicate Ascomycota) has been replaced by the two classes Eurotiomycetes and Dothideomycetes. The rest of the Pezizomycotina also include the previously defined hymenial groups Discomycetes (now Leotiomycetes) and Pyrenomycetes (Sordariomycetes).

Some important groups in Pezizomycotina include: Pezizomycetes (the operculate discomycetes), Leotiomycetes (the inoperculate discomycetes), Laboulbeniomycetes, Sordariomycetes, Dothideomycetes.

Paleopyrenomycites from the Early Devonian Rhynie Chert is the oldest known fossil member of Pezizomycotina, although its position within this subdivision is unclear.
