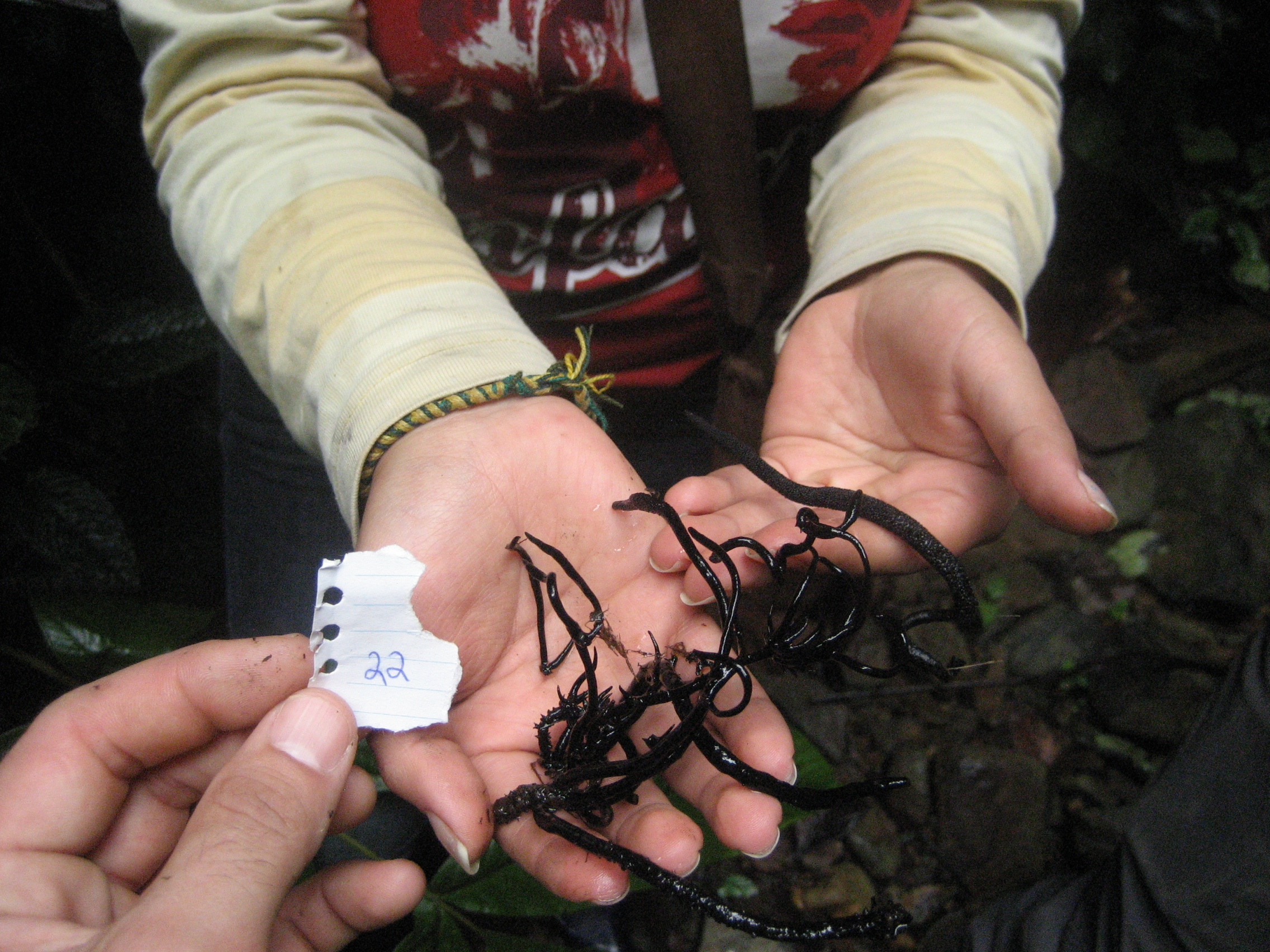
- An unidentified species of Xylobotryum from Ecuador

Scientific classification
- Kingdom: Fungi
- Division: Ascomycota
- Clade: Saccharomyceta
- Subdivision: Pezizomycotina
- Class: Xylobotryomycetes; Voglmayr & Jaklitsch
- Order: Xylobotryales; Voglmayr & Jaklitsch

Families
- Cirrosporiaceae; Xylobotryaceae

= Xylobotryales =

Order of fungi

Xylobotryales is the only order of fungi within the class Xylobotryomycetes and a member of the Ascomycota. It was described in 2019 when DNA-analysis revealed that members of the genera Xylobotryum and Cirrosporium were only distantly related to other members of the Ascomycota.

As of September 2026, the order contains two families, Cirrosporiaceae and Xylobotryaceae with nine accepted species.

Members of the Xylobotryales are saprobic or possibly parasitic. Sexual morphs, where known, are stromatic either branched or unbranched stromata, bearing superficial perithecioid ascomata. Ostiolar canal is periphysate. Hamathecium consists of filiform, septate paraphyses with free ends. Asci are bitunicate or fissitunicate and the apex has an apical ring. Ascospores are pigmented, septate, with longitudinal germ slits. Asexual morphs, where known, are pycnidial and unilocular. Conidiogenesis meristem is arthric with pigmented, septate conidia.
