= Archaeorhizomyces finlayi =

Scientific classification
- Domain: Eukaryota
- Kingdom: Fungi
- Division: Ascomycota
- Class: Archaeorhizomycetes
- Order: Archaeorhizomycetales
- Family: Archaeorhizomycetaceae
- Genus: Archaeorhizomyces
- Species: A. finlayi

Binomial name
- Archaeorhizomyces finlayi Rosling and T.James (2011)

Species of fungus

Archaeorhizomyces finlayi is a species of fungus in the class Archaeorhizomycetes and the type species. When the class was described in 2011, a single order, Archaeorhizomycetales, family, Archaeorhizomycetaceae, genus, Archaeorhizomyces and species, Archaeorhizomyces finlayi, were described, though other species are known to exist. A. finlayi is named in honour of Roger D. Finlay.

Archaeorhizomyces finlayi is known from Scandinavia and North America. The species grows around the roots of coniferous trees, though has been grown in agar culture. Thin hyphae make up the mycelia, measuring from 1 to 2 μm in diameter. Individual hyphal cells are separated by simple septa. Chlamydospores are produced by older organisms, and measure 3 to 6 μm in diameter.
