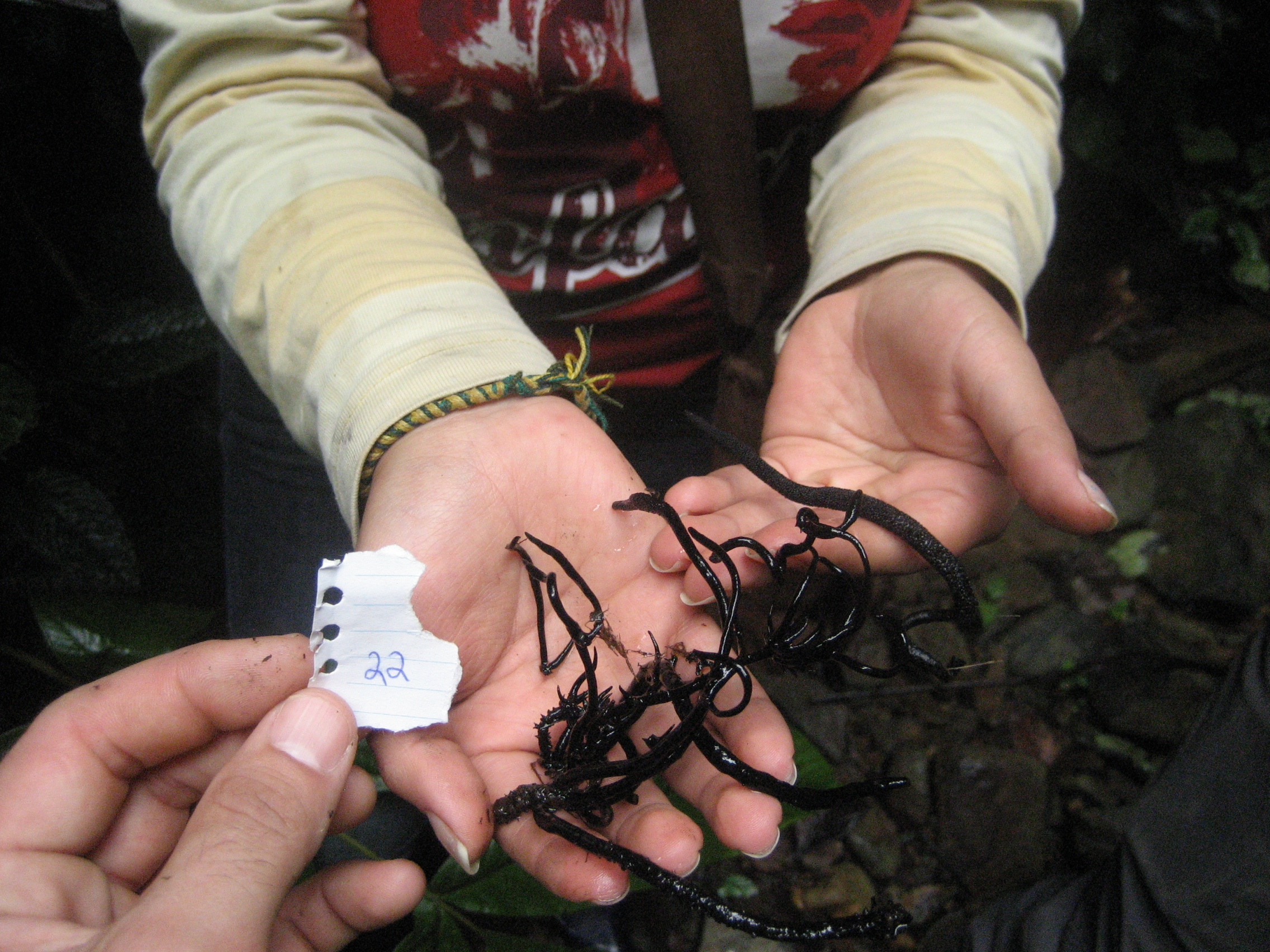
- Xylobotryum in Ecuador, the fruit bodies developed in the water, from a woody substrate

Scientific classification
- Kingdom: Fungi
- Division: Ascomycota
- Class: Xylobotryomycetes
- Order: Xylobotryales
- Family: Xylobotryaceae
- Genus: Xylobotryum; Pat.

Type species
- Xylobotryum andinum Pat.

= Xylobotryum =

Genus of fungi

Xylobotryum is a genus of fungi in the Ascomycota phylum and in the order of Xylobotryales.

== Species ==
As accepted by Species Fungorum;

- Xylobotryum andinum Pat. (1895)
- Xylobotryum coralloides Syd. (1938)
- Xylobotryum dussii Pat. (1903)
- Xylobotryum portentosum (Mont.) Pat. (1900)
- Xylobotryum rickii (Theiss.) Lloyd (1925)

Former species; X. caespitosum (W. Phillips) A.L. Sm. (1912) = Chaenothecopsis caespitosa
