= Pneumocystis oryctolagi =

Scientific classification
- Kingdom: Fungi
- Division: Ascomycota
- Class: Pneumocystidomycetes
- Order: Pneumocystidales
- Family: Pneumocystidaceae
- Genus: Pneumocystis
- Species: P. oryctolagi

Binomial name
- Pneumocystis oryctolagi Dei-Cas, et al. 2006

Species of fungi

Pneumocystis oryctolagi is a species of non-mycelian fungi that colonizes from rabbits. Rabbits often become colonized with the fungus during weaning. Vertical transmission of the fungus has also been experimentally demonstrated. P. oryctolagi can cause pneumonia and respiratory failure in rabbits.

== Taxonomy ==
P. oryctolagi was previously classified under Pneumocystis carinii. In 2006, the fungus was formally designated as a novel species. Its species name is derived from the genus name of its host species, Oryctolagus.

== Biology ==
P. oryctolagi is an extracellular obligate parasite that colonizes the alveolar space in rabbit lungs. P. oryctolagi has a generation time of 1.7 days, which is the shortest of all formally described Pneumocystis. Similar to other Pneumocystis, P. oryctolagi has been unable to be cultivated in axenic cultures.
