= Eupithecia signigera =

Scientific classification
- Domain: Eukaryota
- Kingdom: Animalia
- Phylum: Arthropoda
- Class: Insecta
- Order: Lepidoptera
- Family: Geometridae
- Genus: Eupithecia
- Species: E. signigera

Binomial name
- Eupithecia signigera Butler, 1879

Synonyms
- Eupithecia carearia Leech, 1897

Species of moth

Eupithecia signigera is a moth in the family Geometridae. It is found in Japan and Korea.

The wingspan is about 17–19 mm. Adults are on wing from March to May in one generation per year.

The larvae feed on Abelia spathula, Symplocos chinensis, Pieris japonica, Rhododendron kaempferi and Euonymus alata.
