= Pneumocystis murina =

Scientific classification
- Kingdom: Fungi
- Division: Ascomycota
- Class: Pneumocystidomycetes
- Order: Pneumocystidales
- Family: Pneumocystidaceae
- Genus: Pneumocystis
- Species: P. murina

Binomial name
- Pneumocystis murina Keely, Fischer, Cushion & Stringer (2004)

Species of fungus

Pneumocystis murina is a species of fungus, first isolated from laboratory mice, hence its name. Pneumocystis murina is a species of fungi belonging to the genus Pneumocystis, characterized by its unique cyst-like multinucleate morphology and association with the respiratory tract of mammals. P. murina is particularly notable for its exclusive infection of laboratory mice and its role as an important model for studying human diseases, specifically Pneumocystis jirovecii infections in immunocompromised patients. Pneumocystis murina was first phylogenetically identified and described as a distinct species by Keely, S. P., Fischer, J. M., Cushion, M. T., and Stringer, J. R. in 2012.

== Biology ==
=== Morphology ===
Pneumocystis murina is characterized by its cyst-like multinucleate form, which stains strongly with silver and is found alongside the uninucleate pleiomorphic 'trophic' form in the alveolar spaces of infected mammalian lungs. In comparison to other mammalian strains, P. murina exhibits thinner and more abundant filopodia.

== Host interactions ==
=== Host specificity ===
P. murina is a fungal pathogen that exclusively infects laboratory mice, causing the formation of cysts in the respiratory tract of immunocompromised hosts. This species is not found in nature and has not been reported in wild mice populations.

=== Transmission ===
The fungus is transmitted between mice via inhalation or through the shedding of P. murina from one host to another.

== Habitat ==
Pneumocystis murina inhabits the respiratory tract of laboratory mice, particularly the alveolar spaces within the lungs.

== Geographical Distribution ==
P. murina has no known geographical distribution, as it is exclusively found in laboratory settings.

== Unique Aspects of the Fungus ==
Pneumocystis murina is unique for several reasons. Firstly, it is only found in laboratory mice, not in natural environments. Secondly, it is a pathogen that causes cyst formation in the respiratory tract of immunocompromised lab mice, leading to clinical signs of infection such as dyspnea, weight loss, hunched posture, and scaly skin. P. murina is not editable and it cannot be cultured in vitro.

The species serves as an important model for studying human diseases, particularly Pneumocystis jirovecii infections, which are a significant cause of morbidity and mortality in immunocompromised individuals, such as those with HIV/AIDS or patients receiving immunosuppressive therapies.

The unique aspects of Pneumocystis murina make it an invaluable model for studying the human pathogen Pneumocystis jirovecii, as both pathogens share similar biological and molecular characteristics. Research on P. murina has contributed to the development of novel treatment and prevention strategies for P. jirovecii infections in immunocompromised patients.

One of the critical challenges in studying P. murina and P. jirovecii is their inability to be cultured in vitro, which has hindered the understanding of their life cycles and the development of targeted therapies. However, recent advances in molecular biology and imaging techniques have allowed researchers to gain more insight into the biology and pathogenesis of these organisms.

P. murina infections in laboratory mice serve as an essential tool for understanding the host-pathogen interaction, immune response, and potential treatments for P. jirovecii pneumonia (PJP) in humans. As the incidence of PJP continues to rise due to the increasing number of immunocompromised individuals, the need for effective treatment and prevention strategies is paramount. Research on P. murina and its unique characteristics holds great promise for addressing this significant public health challenge.
