= Pneumocystis wakefieldiae =

Scientific classification
- Domain: Eukaryota
- Kingdom: Fungi
- Division: Ascomycota
- Class: Pneumocystidomycetes
- Order: Pneumocystidales
- Family: Pneumocystidaceae
- Genus: Pneumocystis
- Species: P. wakefieldiae

Binomial name
- Pneumocystis wakefieldiae Cushion, Keely & Stringer (2004)

Species of fungus

Pneumocystis wakefieldiae is a parasitic fungus isolated from rats.
