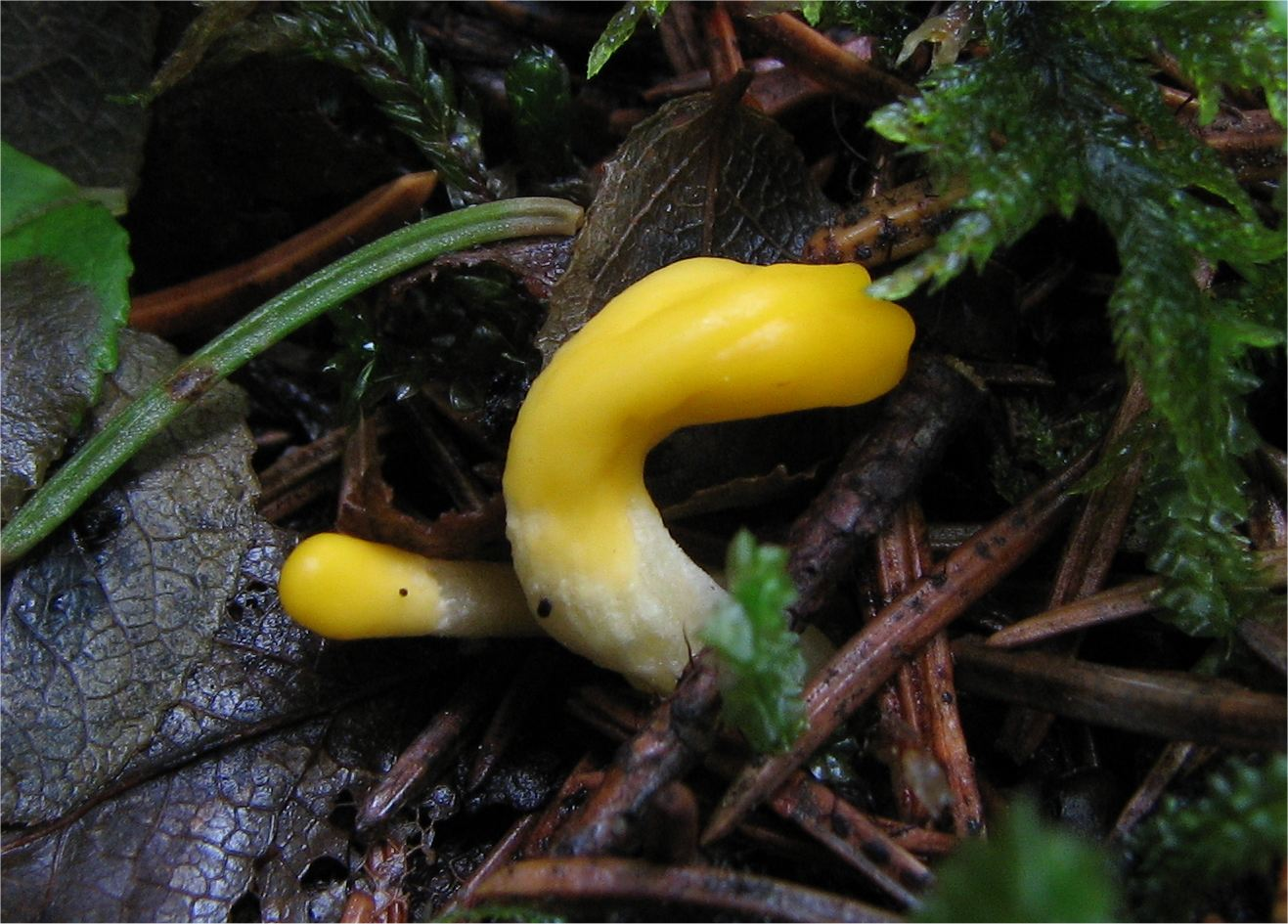

Scientific classification
- Domain: Eukaryota
- Kingdom: Fungi
- Division: Ascomycota
- Class: Neolectomycetes
- Order: Neolectales
- Family: Neolectaceae
- Genus: Neolecta
- Species: N. vitellina

Binomial name
- Neolecta vitellina (Bres.) Korf & J.K.Rogers, 1971

= Neolecta vitellina =

Species of fungus

Neolecta vitellina is a species of fungus belonging to the family Neolectaceae.

It has cosmopolitan distribution.
