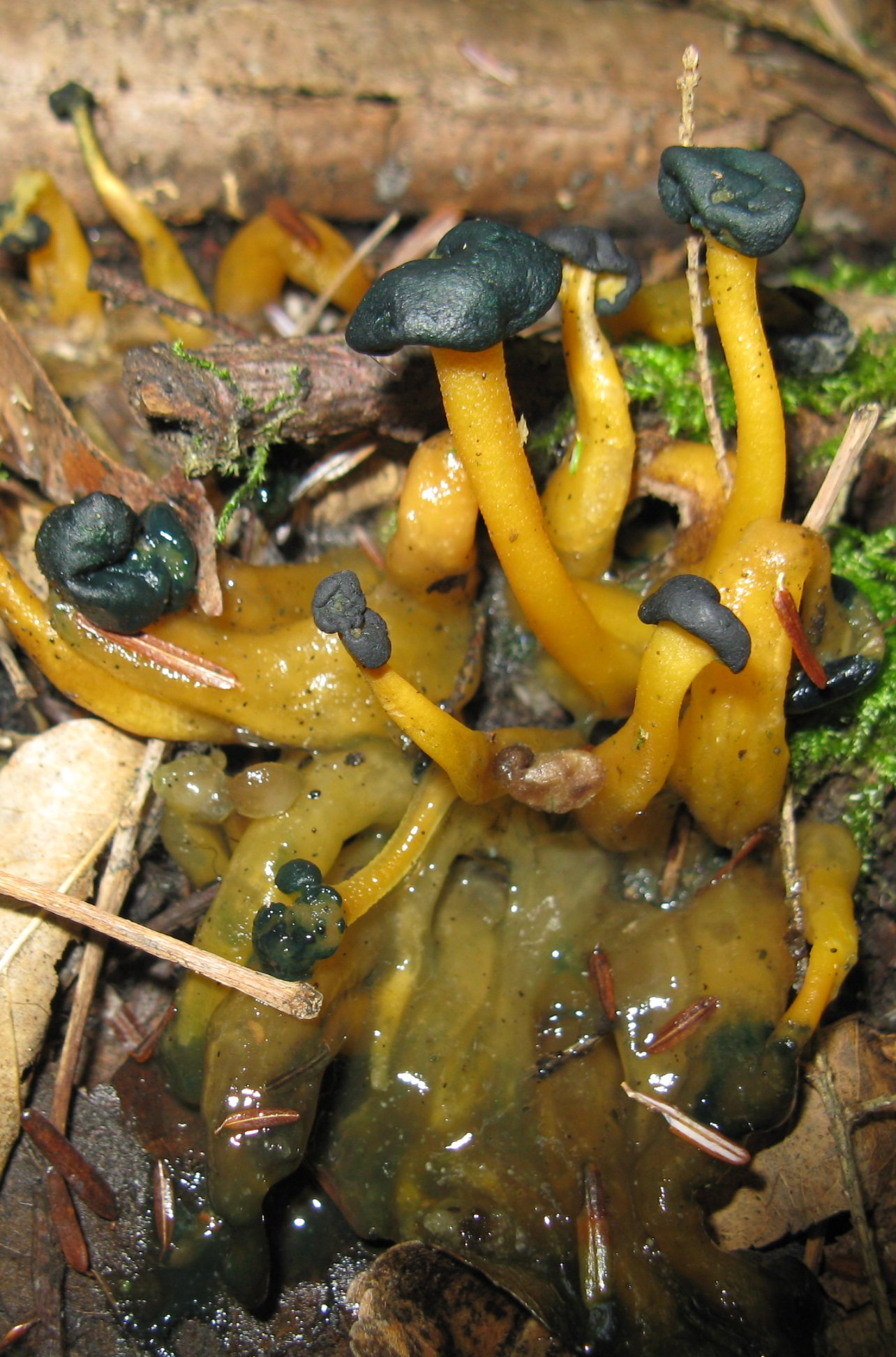
- Leotia viscosa found in West Lebanon, New Hampshire

Scientific classification
- Kingdom: Fungi
- Division: Ascomycota
- Clade: Saccharomyceta
- Subdivision: Pezizomycotina
- Clade: Leotiomyceta; O.E. Erikss. & Winka 1997

Unranked taxa and classes
- Dothideomyceta; Coniocybomycetes; Lichinomycetes; Arthoniomycetes; Collemopsidiomycetes; Dothideomycetes; Eurotiomycetes; Lecanoromycetes; Sordariomyceta; Xylonomycetes; Geoglossomycetes; Leotiomycetes; Laboulbeniomycetes; Sordariomycetes

= Leotiomyceta =

Taxon of filamentous ascomycete fungi

Leotiomyceta represents all the filamentous ascomycete fungi (Pezizomycotina), excluding the classes Pezizomycetes and Orbiliomycetes. It is well supported in several studies comparing DNA sequences in fungi. It has originally been proposed as a superclass but later was proposed as a rankless taxon for any well supported group above class (together with Saccharomyceta, Dothideomyceta, and Sordariomyceta). Rankless taxa do not strictly follow the rules for taxonomic classifications in plants and fungi (ICBN) and therefore these names are informal, although they appear to reflect natural groups.
