= Brachymeiosis =

Brachymeiosis was a hypothesized irregularity in the sexual reproduction of ascomycete fungi, a variant of meiosis following an "extra" karyogamy (nuclear fusion) step. The hypothesized process would have transformed four diploid nuclei into eight haploid ones. The current scientific consensus is that brachymeiosis does not occur in any fungi.

According to the current understanding, ascomycetes reproduce by forming male and female organs (antheridia/spermatia and ascogonia), transferring haploid nuclei from the antheridium to the ascogonium, and growing a dikaryotic ascus containing both nuclei. Karyogamy then occurs in the ascus to form a diploid nucleus, followed by meiosis and mitosis to form eight haploid nuclei in the ascospores. In 1895, the botanist R.A. Harper reported the observation of a second karyogamy event in the ascogonium prior to ascogeny. This would imply the creation of a tetraploid nucleus in the ascus, rather than a diploid one; in order to produce the observed haploid ascospores, a second meiotic reduction in chromosome count would then be necessary. The second reduction was hypothesized to occur during the second or third mitotic division in the ascus, even though chromosome reduction does not typically occur during mitosis. This supposed form of meiosis was termed “brachymeiosis” in 1908 by H. C. I. Fraser.

The existence of brachymeiosis was controversial throughout the first half of the twentieth century, with many conflicting results published. Then, research with improved staining techniques established clearly that only one reductive division occurs in the asci of all examined species, including some which had been believed to undergo brachymeiosis. As a result of these studies, the theories of double fusion and subsequent brachymeiosis were discarded around 1950.

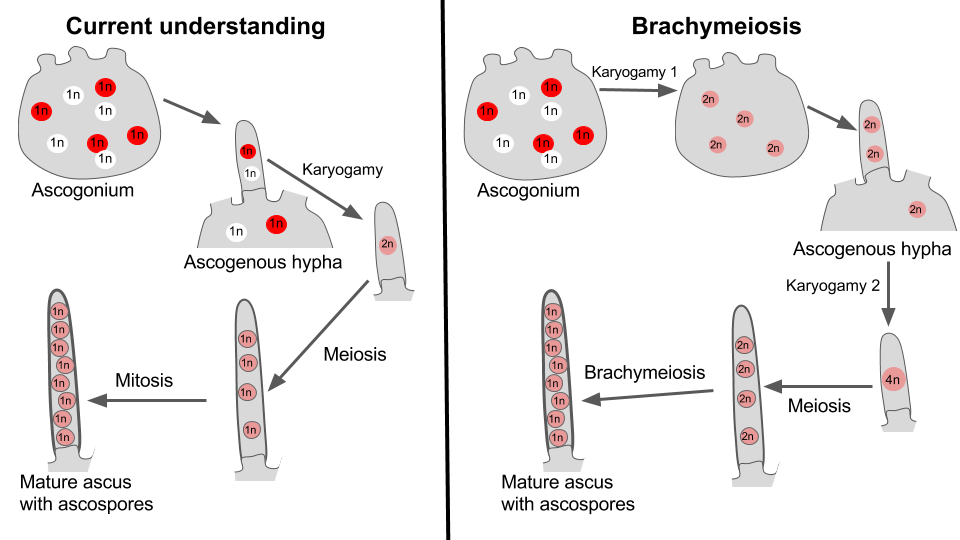
A comparison of the current understanding of sexual reproduction in ascomycete fungi to the brachymeiosis hypothesis.
