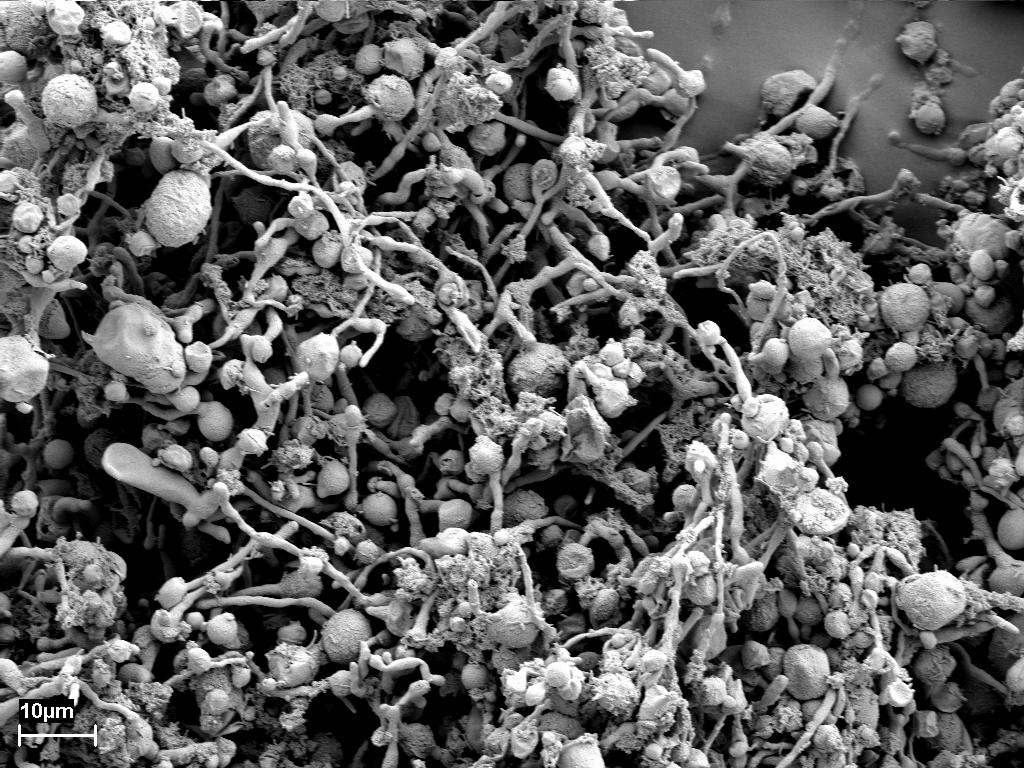
- Archaeorhizomycetes under a scanning electron microscope

Scientific classification
- Kingdom: Fungi
- Division: Ascomycota
- Subdivision: Taphrinomycotina
- Class: Archaeorhizomycetes; Rosling and T. James
- Order: Archaeorhizomycetales; Rosling and T. James
- Family: Archaeorhizomycetaceae; Rosling and T. James
- Genus: Archaeorhizomyces; Rosling and T. James

Type species
- Archaeorhizomyces finlayi Rosling and T. James (2011)

= Archaeorhizomycetes =

Class of fungi

Archaeorhizomycetes is a class of fungi in the subdivision (subphylum) Taphrinomycotina of the division (phylum) Ascomycota. It contains a single order, family and genus, Archaeorhizomyces, with four formally described species. Considering undescribed diversity from environmental DNA studies, it is nevertheless thought to be the most species-rich class in Taphrinomycotina. Estimates of the total number of OTUs within the class range from approximately 500 to more than 16,000. Archaeorhizomycetes are globally distributed and grow in soil and around roots.

== Etymology ==
The name Archaeorhizomyces comes from the Greek arkhaio-, meaning ancient, which is in reference to the basality of the fungus, rhiza, in reference to roots, and mykes, in reference to fungi.

== History ==
The lineage was first discovered and reported in 2003 from alpine tundra soils. Prior to its formal description, Archaeorhizomycetes was referred to as Soil Clone Group 1 (SCG1) and was known only from DNA sequencing of environmental samples. SCG1 had been detected independently in ecological studies of soil in more than fifty cases worldwide using three different gene regions. Neither fruit bodies nor spores had been observed.

Archaeorhizomycetes may have been overlooked in many fungal DNA metabarcoding studies due to primer bias, which typically use the ITS region of ribosomal DNA as a genetic marker. The ribosomal DNA of Archaeorhizomycetes has two mismatches in the binding sites of ITS4, the most commonly used reverse primer for amplifying fungal DNA. The unusually short ITS region of Archaeorhizomycetes may also inflate their relative read abundance in studies using Illumina sequencing.

Archaeorhizomycetes was described by a team led by Anna Rosling in 2011, after the lineage was first isolated in axenic culture and its type species, Archaeorhizomyces finlayi, was characterised. Archaeorhizomyces borealis was described in 2014 together with an estimate that the class may consist of close to 500 species based on sequences available in public databases. In 2020, two species, Archaeorhizomyces victor nom. seq. and Archaeorhizomyces secundus nom. seq., were proposed without type material, based solely on environmental sequence data and ecological metadata by combining phylogenetic evidence with niche partitioning across soil horizons. A. victor nom. seq. is among the most abundant Archaeorhizomycetes in boreal soils and is one of the most frequently detected fungi in Sweden. Archaeorhizomyces notokirishimae and Archaeorhizomyces ryukyuensis were isolated and described in 2024.

== Morphology ==
Archaeorhizomycetes grow slowly in culture, forming small creamy-white to yellowish colonies. The mycelium consists of thin hyphae, usually 1-2 μm, with simple septa lacking pores, and is often covered in extracellular material. Some species are dimorphic and can grow both as unicellular yeast and multicellular hypha.

== Distribution and ecology ==
Global Archaeorhizomycetes distribution and relative read abundance, based on DNA metabarcoding of the fungal ITS region in 84,972 environmental samples

Archaeorhizomycetes are found in soil on every continent, across habitats ranging from coniferous forests to ericaceous heath and tundra. Archaeorhizomycetes are a dominant fungal class in some habitats, such as boreal forests of spruce and pine, as well as alpine vegetation. Specific known host plants of various Archaeorhizomycetes species include hemlock, spruce, pine and heather, but other species colonise hardwoods generally.

When discovered, Archaeorhizomycetes was found to be seasonal, suggesting they are dependent on carbon compounds from the roots. However, when grown in culture, A. finlayi, was shown to be able to grow using either glucose or cellulose as its sole source of carbon, suggesting "that it may be involved in decomposition and not require direct carbon transfer from the plant through symbiosis".

The precise ecological role of Archaeorhizomycetes remains uncertain. All Archaeorhizomycetes cultures have been isolated from surface-sterilised roots. A. finlayi and A. borealis were isolated from coniferous trees and A. notokirishimae and A. ryukyuensis from ericaceous shrubs. A. finlayi colonises pine roots in vitro without causing disease or forming the mantle and Hartig net typical of ectomycorrhizal fungi. In vitro, both A. notokirishimae and A. ryukyuensis form hyphal coils inside root cells of blueberry and Rhododendron, resembling ericoid mycorrhizal fungi.
