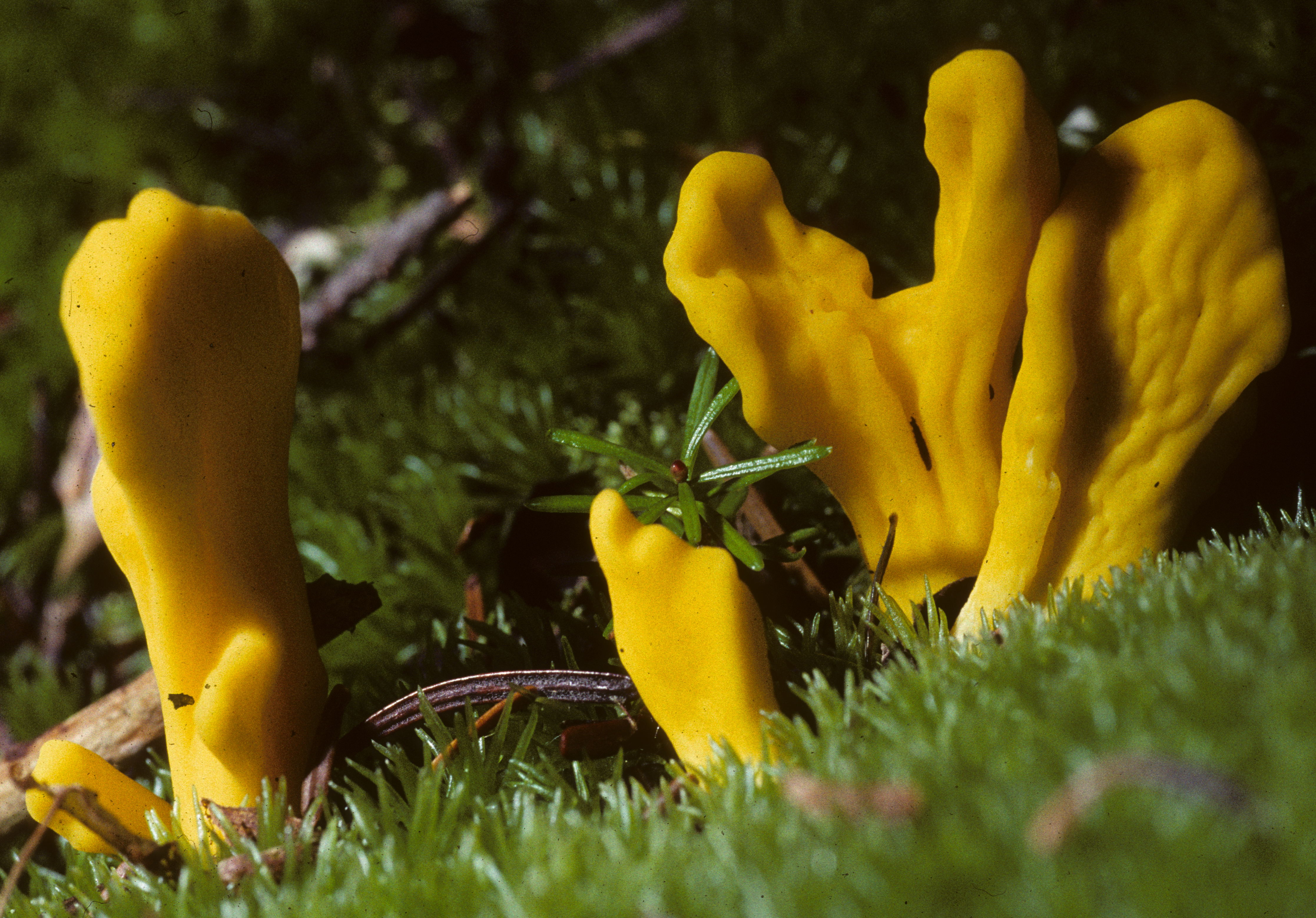
- Neolecta irregularis

Scientific classification
- Kingdom: Fungi
- Division: Ascomycota
- Subdivision: Taphrinomycotina
- Class: Neolectomycetes; O.E. Erikss. & Winka 1997
- Order: Neolectales; Landvik, O.E. Erikss, Gargas & P. Gustaffs. 1993
- Family: Neolectaceae; Redhead 1977
- Genus: Neolecta; Speg. 1881

Species
- Neolecta flavovirescens; Neolecta irregularis (Irregular Earth Tongue); Neolecta vitellina (=N. aurantiaca) (Egg-yellow Earth Tongue)

= Neolecta =

Genus of fungi

Neolecta is a genus of ascomycetous fungi. The species share the English designation "Earth tongues" along with some better-known fungi (e.g. Geoglossum, Microglossum) with a similar general form, but in fact they are only distantly related.

Neolecta is the only genus belonging to the family Neolectaceae, which is the only family belonging to the order Neolectales. Neolectales, in turn, is the only order belonging to the class Neolectomycetes, which belongs to the subdivision Taphrinomycotina of the Ascomycota.

== Description ==
Fruiting bodies take the shape of unbranched to lobed bright yellowish, orangish to pale yellow-green colored, club-shaped, smooth, fleshy columns up to about 7 centimetres (3 inches) tall.

Neolecta fruitbodies consist of hyphae and a hymenium. The hymenium lacks paraphyses and the asci lack croziers, which makes the genus distinctive among other earth-tongues. Neolecta vitellina forms masses of conidia by budding, hinting at the possibility that it also produces a yeast state.

=== Similar species ===
Species of the genus may resemble those of Clavulinopsis and Spathularia.

== Taxonomy and genomics ==
Neolecta does not have any close relatives. Phylogenetically, it clusters weakly with a bizarre group of basal Ascomycota including: Taphrina, a dimorphic, half yeast, half filamentous genus parasitic on leaves, branches, and catkins; Schizosaccharomyces, a genus of fission yeasts (e.g. Schizosaccharomyces pombe); and Pneumocystis, a yeast-like genus of mammalian parasites that can infect humans. To date, the genus has been unculturable, suggesting it is either parasitic or symbiotic. It provides important evidence for the evolutionary history of the Ascomycota and has been called a living fossil.

The genome of N. irregularis has been sequenced. Sequence analysis has revealed that rudimentary multicellularity is deeply rooted in the Ascomycota.

== Distribution and habitat ==
Neolecta is found in Asia, Northern Europe, North America, and southern Brazil. The species all live in association with trees, and at least one, N. vitellina, grows from the rootlets of the host plant, but it is not known whether this fungal genus is parasitic, saprotrophic, or mutualistic. All species of Neolecta are said to be edible.
