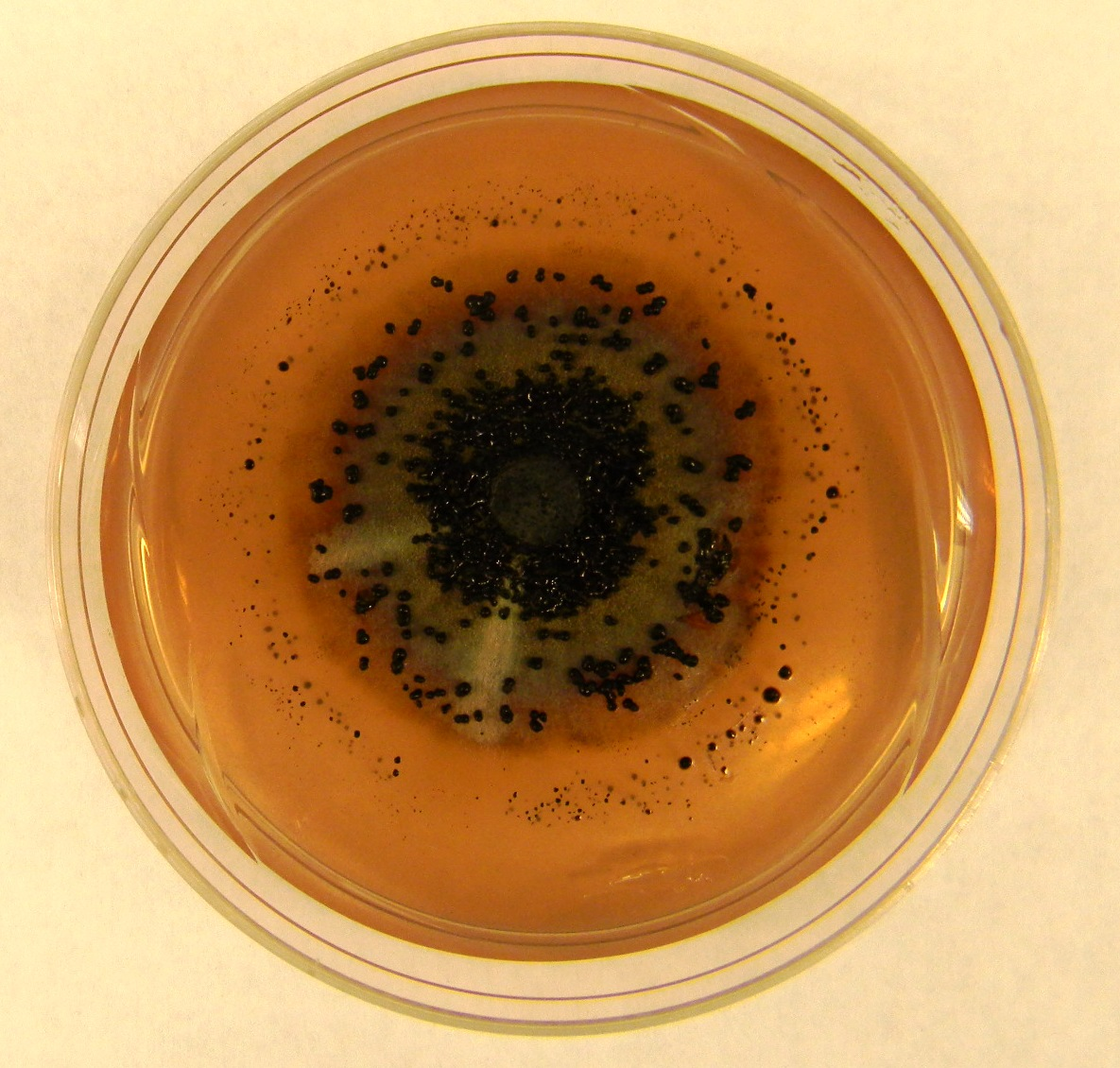
- Four-week old culture of Xylona heveae growing on Potato dextrose agar

Scientific classification
- Domain: Eukaryota
- Kingdom: Fungi
- Division: Ascomycota
- Class: Xylonomycetes; Gazis & P. Chaverri, 2012

Orders
- Symbiotaphrinales; Xylonales

= Xylonomycetes =

Class of fungi

The Xylonomycetes are a class of fungi, which holds 2 orders of Symbiotaphrinales Baral & E. Weber, and Xylonales Gazis & P. Chaverri.

== History ==
During a culture-based survey of living sapwood and leaves of rubber trees (Hevea spp.) in remote forests of Peru. Multilocus phylogenetic analyses reveal that this new lineage came from the radiation of the Leotiomyceta class which generated several other classes including Arthoniomycetes, Dothideomycetes, Eurotiomycetes, Geoglossomycetes, Lecanoromycetes, Leotiomycetes, Lichinomycetes and Sordariomycetes. Due to the unique morphological, physiological, and ecological traits relative to known endophytes, Xylonomycetes was deemed unique enough to be separate.

Within the superclass of Pezizomycotina, the 6 classes (including Pezizomycetes and Orbiliomycetes) were monophyletic apart from Xylonomycetes. Xylonomycetes, Eurotiomycetes and Dothideomycetes were deemed to have had a single origin.

They contain unspecific peroxygenases (UPO) enzymes which can be used to determine taxonomic afflication.

It contains the wood endophytes in Xylona and the endosymbionts of beetles in Symbiotaphrina. It has been suggested that these seeming unrelated genera might be linked via a yeast-like stage. As an asexual yeast living within the insect guts, with an asexual mycelial form and then a sexual form associated with the dead wood. Although, the frequency of transfer between free-living and symbiotic conditions is unknown and could be very low. As the yeasts are transferred vertically via the ovipositor of the female inset to the egg surface.

== Taxon ==
Xylonomycetes holds (orders and families);

- Symbiotaphrinales
  - Symbiotaphrinaceae Baral & E. Weber, 2018
- Xylonales
  - Xylonaceae Gazis & P. Chaverri, 2012
