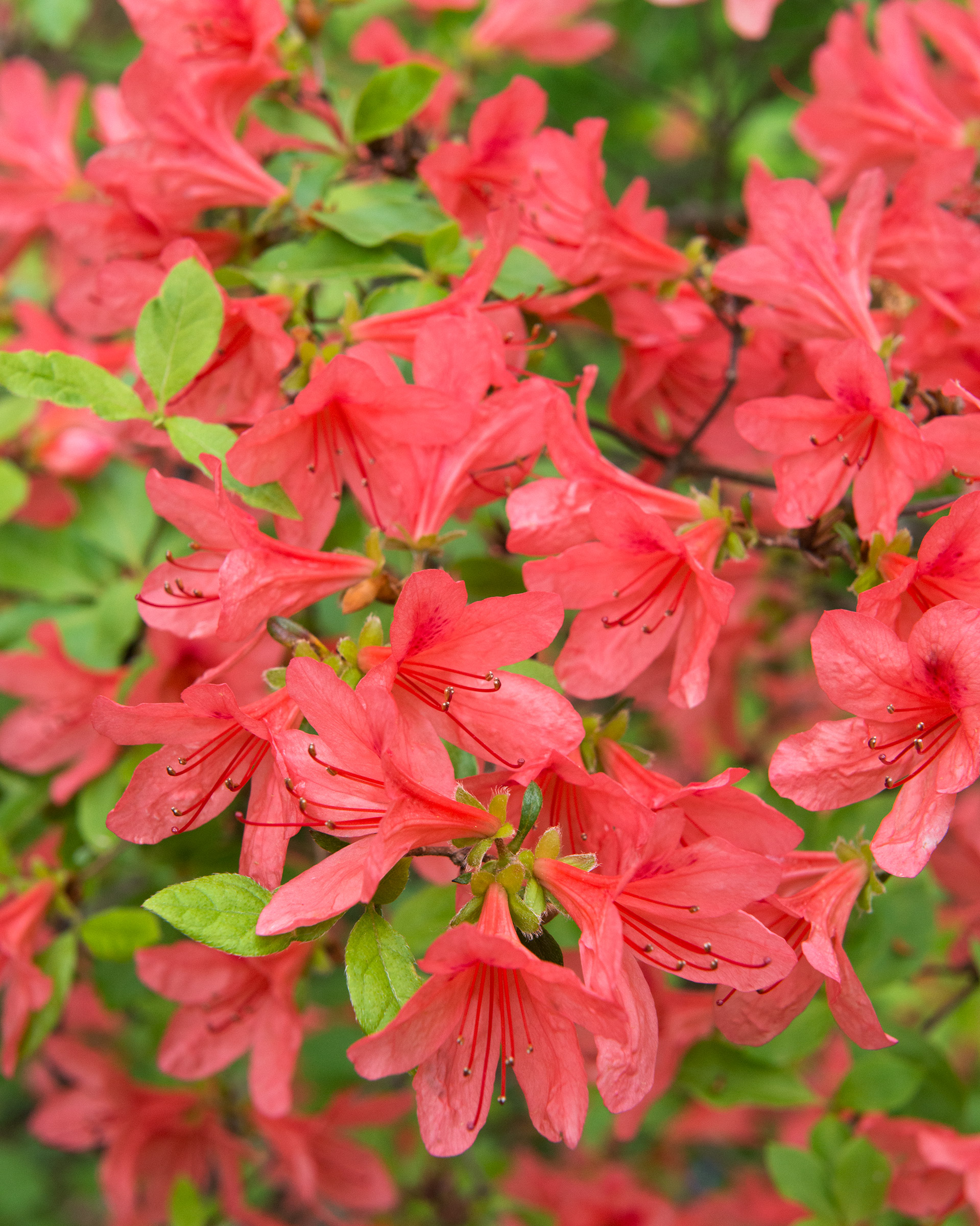
- Flowers
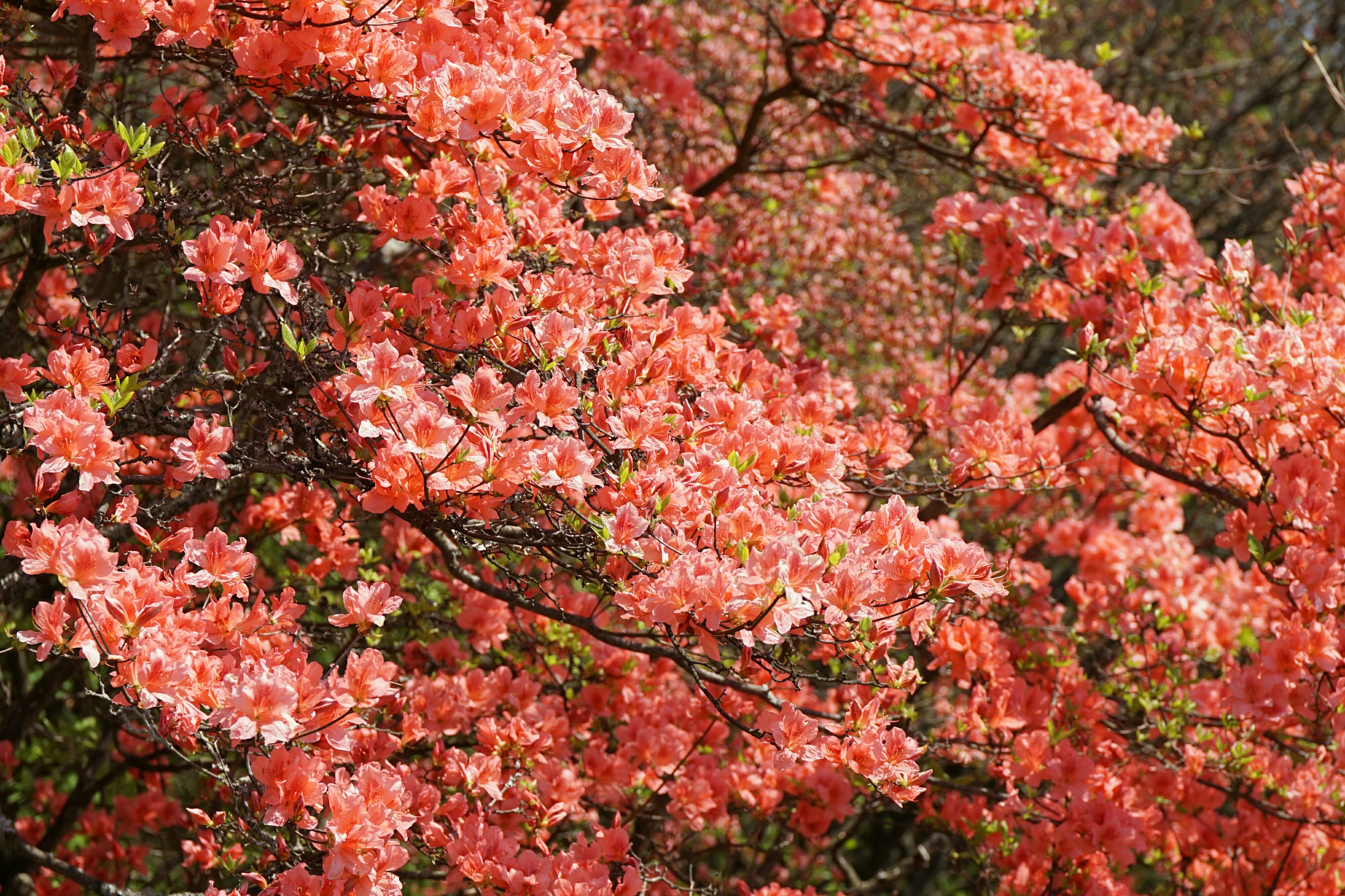
- In a park

Scientific classification
- Kingdom: Plantae
- Clade: Tracheophytes
- Clade: Angiosperms
- Clade: Eudicots
- Clade: Asterids
- Order: Ericales
- Family: Ericaceae
- Genus: Rhododendron
- Species: R. kaempferi

Binomial name
- Rhododendron kaempferi Planch.

Synonyms
- List: Azalea indica var. kaempferi (Planch.) Rehder; Azalea kaempferi (Planch.) André; Rhododendron indicum var. kaempferi (Planch.) Maxim.; Rhododendron indicum var. mikawanum Makino; Rhododendron iyoense Nakai; Rhododendron kaempferi var. komatsui Nakai; Rhododendron kaempferi f. kozushimense T.Yamaz.; Rhododendron lusidusculum Nakai; Rhododendron macrogemmum (Nakai) Nakai; Rhododendron obtusum f. album Nakai; Rhododendron obtusum var. kaempferi (Planch.) E.H.Wilson; Rhododendron obtusum f. komatsui (Nakai) H.Hara; Rhododendron obtusum var. macrogemma (Nakai) Kitam.; Rhododendron obtusum var. mikawanum (Makino) T.Yamaz.; Rhododendron obtusum var. saikaiense T.Yamaz.; Rhododendron obtusum var. tubiflorum (Komatsu) T.Yamaz.; Rhododendron obtusum f. tubiflorum (Komatsu) Makino; Rhododendron scabrum var. kaempferi (Planch.) Nakai; Rhododendron sieboldii Miq.

= Rhododendron kaempferi =

Species of plant

Rhododendron kaempferi, the torch azalea or Kaempferi azalea, is a species of flowering plant in the family Ericaceae. It is native to Japan. A semi-evergreen shrub, its 'Orange King' cultivar has gained the Royal Horticultural Society's Award of Garden Merit. There are a number of other cultivars available with a variety of flower colors.

== Subtaxa ==
The following varieties are accepted:

- Rhododendron kaempferi var. iyoense (Nakai) Sugim.
- Rhododendron kaempferi var. kaempferi – Honshu, Kyushu
- Rhododendron kaempferi var. lusidusculum (Nakai) Sugim.
- Rhododendron kaempferi var. macrogemmum Nakai – Izu Peninsula, Izu Islands
- Rhododendron kaempferi var. mikawanum (Makino) Makino – Aichi Prefecture
- Rhododendron kaempferi var. saikaiense (T.Yamaz.) T.Yamaz. – Kyushu
- Rhododendron kaempferi var. tubiflorum Komatsu – western Honshu

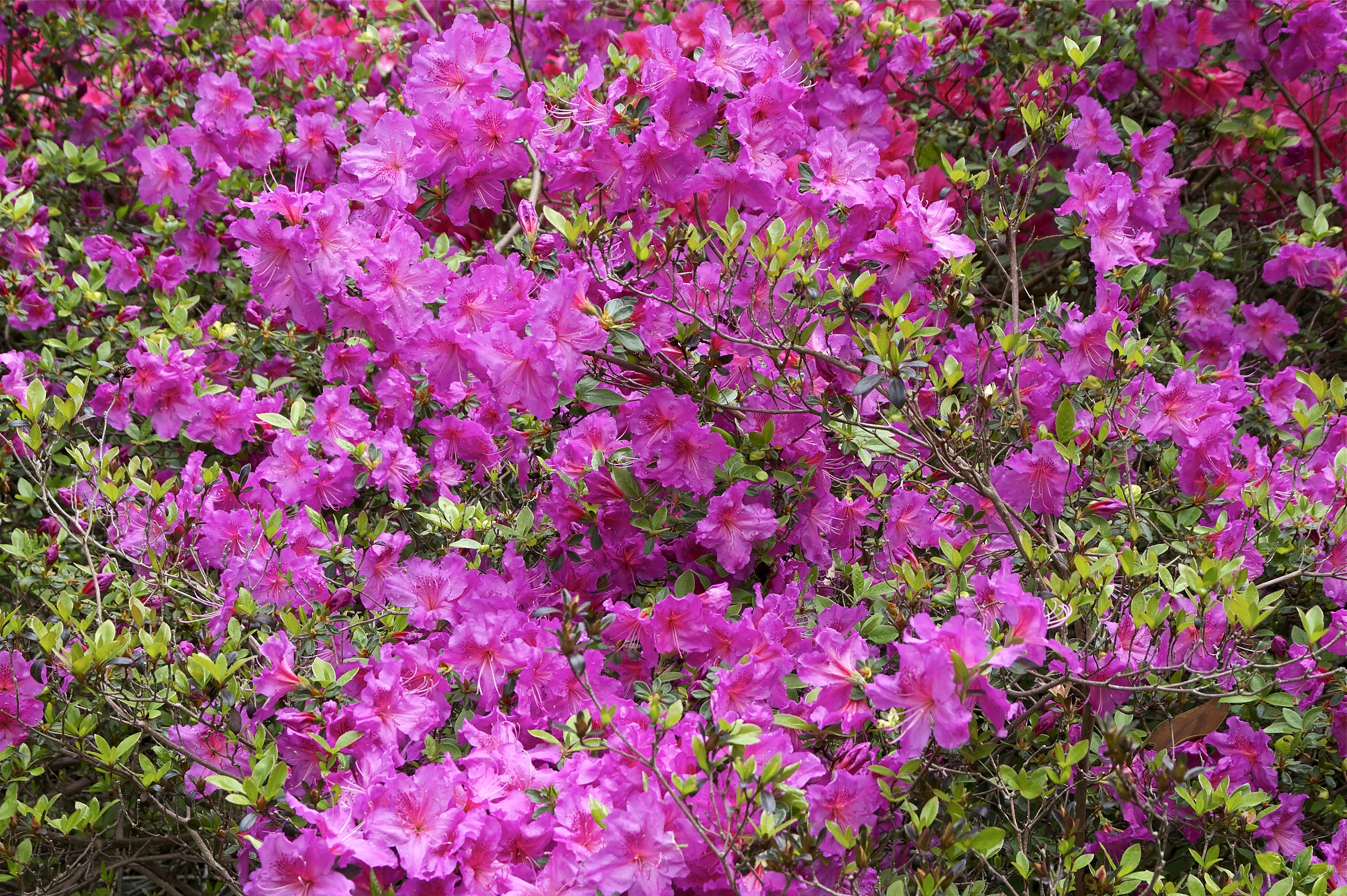
In the Garden of Diana, Palace of Fontainebleau
