= Lahmia =

Scientific classification
- Kingdom: Fungi
- Division: Ascomycota
- Class: Leotiomycetes
- Order: Lahmiales; O.E. Erikss.
- Family: Lahmiaceae; O.E. Erikss.
- Genus: Lahmia; Körb.

Type species
- Lahmia kunzei (Flot.) Körb.

Synonyms
- Parkerella A. Funk

Genus of fungi

Lahmia is a genus of fungi in the phylum Ascomycota, or sac fungi. It is the only genus in the family Lahmiaceae and the order Lahmiales.

The genus name of Lahmia is in honour of Johann Gottlieb Franz-Xaver Lahm (1811-1888), who was a German clergyman and botanist (Lichenology and Mycology). The genus of Lahmia was circumscribed by Gustav Wilhelm Koerber in Parerga Lichenol on page 281 in 1861.
