= Taphrinomycotina =

- From top left corner: Pneumocystis jirovecii (Pneumocystidomycetes), Archaeorhizomyces (Archaeorhizomycetes), Taphrina deformans (Taphrinomycetes), Neolecta irregularis (Neolectomycetes), Schizosaccharomyces pombe (Schizosaccharomycetes)

Scientific classification
- Kingdom: Fungi
- Division: Ascomycota
- Subdivision: Taphrinomycotina; O.E. Erikss. & Winka 1997

Classes
- Archaeorhizomycetes; Neolectomycetes; Pneumocystidomycetes; Schizosaccharomycetes; Taphrinomycetes

Subdivision of fungi

The Taphrinomycotina are one of three subdivisions constituting the Ascomycota (fungi that form their spores in a sac-like ascus) and is more or less synonymous with the slightly older invalid name Archiascomycetes (sometimes spelled Archaeascomycetes; archea = ancient). Recent molecular studies suggest that the group is monophyletic and basal to the rest of the Ascomycota.

The major taxa are Schizosaccharomycetes, Taphrinomycetes, Neolectomycetes, and Pneumocystis.

The Schizosaccharomycetes are the yeasts (e.g. Schizosaccharomyces) that reproduce by fission rather than budding, unlike most other yeasts, many of which are in the subdivision Saccharomycotina.

The Taphrinomycetes are dimorphic plant parasites (e.g. Taphrina) with both a yeast state and a filamentous (hyphal) state in infected plants. They characteristically infect leaves, catkins, and branches, not roots. Taphrinomycetes form asci but no ascomata.

The Neolectomycetes are species in a single genus, Neolecta, which are the only members of the subdivision that form ascomata (fruiting bodies), and which specifically grow out of root tips. They may have a yeast state (ascospores bud in the asci).

The Pneumocystidomycetes also contains only one genus of fungi, Pneumocystis. Pneumocystis are all obligate parasites of mammals. One can infect humans.

None has ascogenous hyphae giving rise to the asci.
