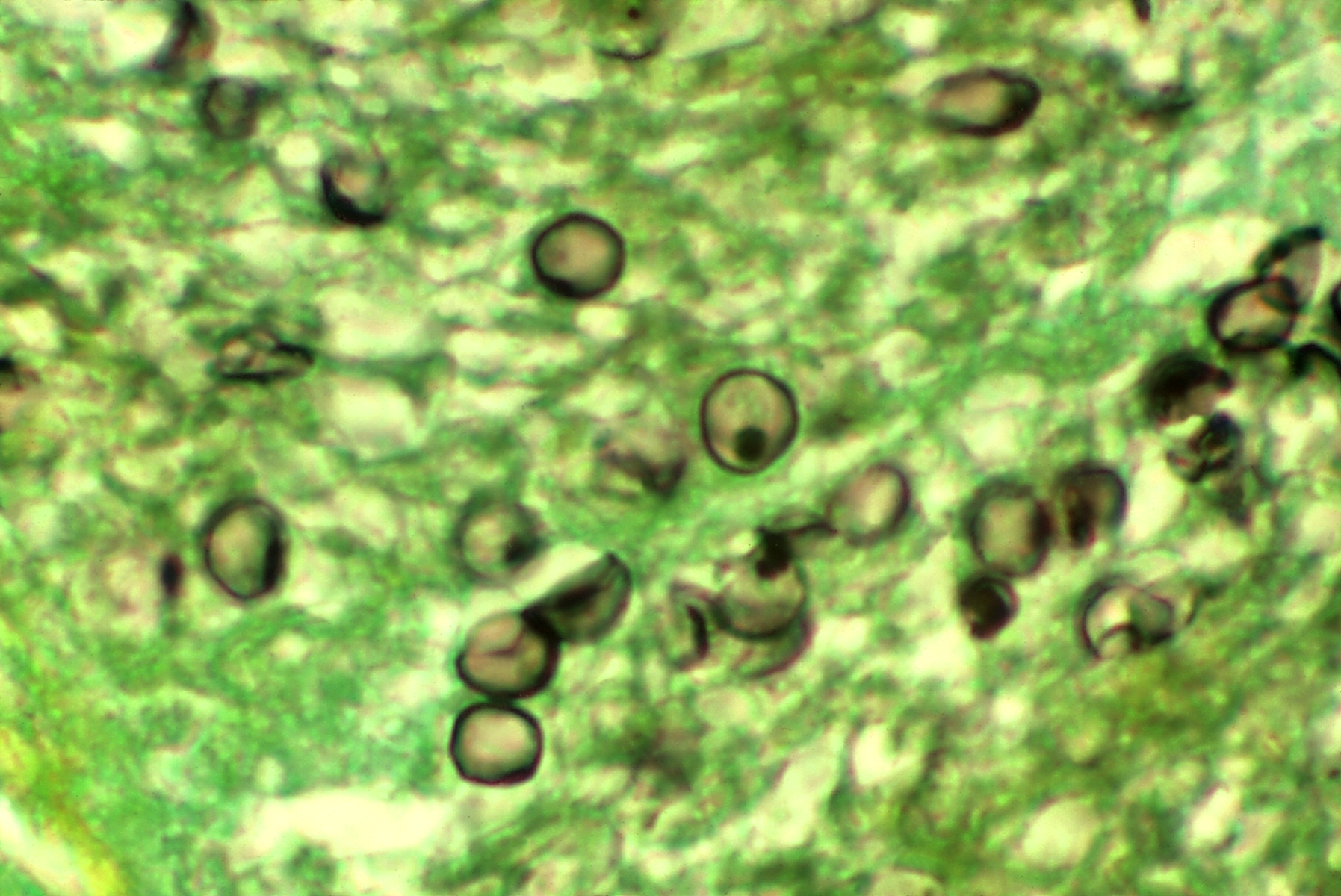
- Pneumocystis jirovecii in tissue

Scientific classification
- Kingdom: Fungi
- Division: Ascomycota
- Subdivision: Taphrinomycotina
- Class: Pneumocystidomycetes; O.E.Erikss. & Winka (1997)
- Order: Pneumocystidales; O.E.Erikss. (1994)
- Family: Pneumocystidaceae; O.E.Erikss. (1994)
- Genus: Pneumocystis; P.Delanoë & Delanoë (1912)

Type species
- Pneumocystis carinii P.Delanoë & Delanoë (1912)

Species
- Pneumocystis jirovecii; Pneumocystis murina; Pneumocystis oryctolagi; Pneumocystis wakefieldiae

Synonyms
- Pneumocystomycetes

= Pneumocystidomycetes =

Class of fungi

The Pneumocystidomycetes are a class of ascomycete fungi. It includes the single order Pneumocystidales, which contains the single monotypic family Pneumocystidaceae, which in turn contains the genus Pneumocystis, causative agent of Pneumocystis pneumonia.

Pneumocystis have been isolated from hundreds of different mammal species; however, currently only 6 species are recognized by NCBI.
