= Carpenterella (fungus) =

Scientific classification
- Kingdom: Fungi
- Division: Chytridiomycota
- Class: Chytridiomycetes
- Order: Synchytriales
- Family: Synchytriaceae
- Genus: Carpenterella; Tehon & H. A. Harris
- Species: C. molinea

Binomial name
- Carpenterella molinea Tehon & H. A. Harris

Synonyms
- Carpenterophlyctis molinae (Tehon & H. A. Harris) Doweld

Genus of fungi

Carpenterella is a genus erected for a species of chytrid fungus, Carpenterella molinea, that inhabits the deep vascular xylem tissues of the Moline variety of the American elm tree, causing disease. The genus name recognizes American plant pathologist Clarence Willard Carpenter (1888-1946), who described a similar fungus in relation to chlorotic streak disease of sugar cane in Hawaii.
