= Synchytrium liquidambaris =

Scientific classification
- Domain: Eukaryota
- Kingdom: Fungi
- Division: Chytridiomycota
- Class: Chytridiomycetes
- Order: Synchytriales
- Family: Synchytriaceae
- Genus: Synchytrium
- Species: S. liquidambaris

Binomial name
- Synchytrium liquidambaris M.T.Cook (1953)

Species of fungus

Synchytrium liquidambaris is a plant pathogen infecting sweetgum trees, that employs osmosis as a mechanism for the absorption of nutrients during the infection process.
