= Catenochytridium carolinianum =

Scientific classification
- Domain: Eukaryota
- Kingdom: Fungi
- Division: Chytridiomycota
- Class: Cladochytriomycetes
- Order: Cladochytriales
- Family: Endochytriaceae
- Genus: Catenochytridium
- Species: C. carolinianum

Binomial name
- Catenochytridium carolinianum Berdan (1939)

Species of fungus

Catenochytridium carolinianum is a species of fungus in the genus Catenochytridium. It is the type species of the genus.
