= Synchytrium fragariae =

Scientific classification
- Domain: Eukaryota
- Kingdom: Fungi
- Division: Chytridiomycota
- Class: Chytridiomycetes
- Order: Synchytriales
- Family: Synchytriaceae
- Genus: Synchytrium
- Species: S. fragariae

Binomial name
- Synchytrium fragariae Zeller & L.Campb. (1949)

Species of fungus

Synchytrium fragariae is a species of chytrid fungus in the Synchytriaceae family. It is a plant pathogen infecting strawberries.
