= Gorgonomyces =

Scientific classification
- Domain: Eukaryota
- Kingdom: Fungi
- Division: Chytridiomycota
- Class: Chytridiomycetes
- Order: Rhizophydiales
- Family: Gorgonomycetaceae
- Genus: Gorgonomyces; Letcher, 2008

Genus of fungi

Gorgonomyces is a genus of fungi belonging to the family Gorgonomycetaceae.

Species:

- Gorgonomyces haynaldii (Schaarschm.) Letcher
