= Alphamyces =

Scientific classification
- Domain: Eukaryota
- Kingdom: Fungi
- Division: Chytridiomycota
- Class: Chytridiomycetes
- Order: Rhizophydiales
- Family: Alphamycetaceae
- Genus: Alphamyces; P.M.Letcher, 2008

Genus of fungi

Alphamyces is a genus of fungi belonging to the family Alphamycetaceae.

The species of this genus are found in Great Britain.

Species:

- Alphamyces chaetifer (Sparrow) Letcher
