= Gaertneriomyces =

Scientific classification
- Domain: Eukaryota
- Kingdom: Fungi
- Division: Chytridiomycota
- Class: Chytridiomycetes
- Order: Spizellomycetales
- Family: Spizellomycetaceae
- Genus: Gaertneriomyces; D.J.S.Barr, 1980

Genus of fungi

Gaertneriomyces is a genus of fungi belonging to the family Spizellomycetaceae.

The species of this genus are found in Southeastern Asia and Australia.

Species:

- Gaertneriomyces californicus (D.J.S.Barr) M.J.Powell & Letcher
- Gaertneriomyces palmatus M.J.Powell & Letcher
- Gaertneriomyces semiglobifer Uebelm. ex D.J.S.Barr
- Gaertneriomyces spectabile S.F.Chen & C.Y.Chien
- Gaertneriomyces spectabilis Uebelm. ex S.F.Chen, C.Y.Chien & M.J.Powell
