= Nowakowskiella elegans =

Scientific classification
- Domain: Eukaryota
- Kingdom: Fungi
- Division: Chytridiomycota
- Class: Cladochytriomycetes
- Order: Cladochytriales
- Family: Nowakowskiellaceae
- Genus: Nowakowskiella
- Species: N. elegans

Binomial name
- Nowakowskiella elegans (Nowak.) J.Schröt., in Engler & Prantl 1893

Synonyms
- Cladochytrium elegans Nowak., 1877

Species of fungus

Nowakowskiella elegans is a species of fungus in the family Nowakowskiellaceae.
