= Canteria =

Scientific classification
- Domain: Eukaryota
- Kingdom: Fungi
- Division: Chytridiomycota
- Class: Cladochytriomycetes
- Order: Cladochytriales
- Family: Endochytriaceae
- Genus: Canteria; Karling (1971)
- Species: C. apophysata

Binomial name
- Canteria apophysata (Canter) Karling (1971)

Synonyms
- Phlyctidium apophysatum Canter (1947)

Single-species genus of fungi

Canteria is a fungal genus in the family Endochytriaceae. A monotypic genus, it contain the single species Canteria apophysata, a parasite of the alga Mougeotia. The genus was circumscribed by John S. Karling in 1971.
