= Aquamyces =

Scientific classification
- Domain: Eukaryota
- Kingdom: Fungi
- Division: Chytridiomycota
- Class: Chytridiomycetes
- Order: Rhizophydiales
- Family: Aquamycetaceae
- Genus: Aquamyces; Letcher, 2008

Genus of fungi

Aquamyces is a genus of fungi belonging to the family Aquamycetaceae.

Species:

- Aquamyces chlorogonii (Serbinow) Letcher
