= Globomyces =

Scientific classification
- Kingdom: Fungi
- Division: Chytridiomycota
- Class: Chytridiomycetes
- Order: Rhizophydiales
- Genus: Globomyces; Letcher

Genus of fungi

Globomyces is a genus of fungi belonging to the family Globomycetaceae.

The species of this genus are found in Europe.

Species:

- Globomyces pollinis-pini (A.Braun) Letcher
