= Coralloidiomyces =

Scientific classification
- Domain: Eukaryota
- Kingdom: Fungi
- Division: Chytridiomycota
- Class: Chytridiomycetes
- Order: Rhizophydiales
- Genus: Coralloidiomyces; Letcher, 2008

Genus of fungi

Coralloidiomyces is a genus of fungi belonging to the order Rhizophydiales, family unknown.

The species of this genus are found in Denmark.

Species:

- Coralloidiomyces digitatus Letcher
