= Kochiomyces =

Scientific classification
- Domain: Eukaryota
- Kingdom: Fungi
- Division: Chytridiomycota
- Class: Chytridiomycetes
- Order: Spizellomycetales
- Family: Spizellomycetaceae
- Genus: Kochiomyces; D.J.S.Barr, 1980

Genus of fungi

Kochiomyces is a genus of fungi belonging to the family Spizellomycetaceae.

The species of this genus are found in Denmark.

Species:

- Kochiomyces dichotomus (Umphlett) D.J.S.Barr
