= Angulomyces =

Scientific classification
- Domain: Eukaryota
- Kingdom: Fungi
- Division: Chytridiomycota
- Class: Chytridiomycetes
- Order: Rhizophydiales
- Genus: Angulomyces

Genus of fungi

Angulomyces is a genus of fungi belonging to the family Angulomycetaceae.

The species of this genus are found in Northern America.

Species:

- Angulomyces argentinensis Letcher
