= Boothiomyces =

Scientific classification
- Domain: Eukaryota
- Kingdom: Fungi
- Division: Chytridiomycota
- Class: Chytridiomycetes
- Order: Rhizophydiales
- Family: Terramycetaceae
- Genus: Boothiomyces; Letcher, 2006

Genus of fungi

Boothiomyces is a genus of fungi belonging to the family Terramycetaceae.

The genus has almost cosmopolitan distribution.

Species:

- Boothiomyces macroporosus (Karling) Letcher
