= Rhizophydium graminis =

Scientific classification
- Kingdom: Fungi
- Division: Chytridiomycota
- Class: Chytridiomycetes
- Order: Rhizophydiales
- Genus: Rhizophydium
- Species: R. graminis

Binomial name
- Rhizophydium graminis Ledingham (1936)

Species of fungus

Rhizophydium graminis is a plant pathogen infecting the roots of both monocots including wheat and other Poaceae, and a few dicots.
