= Kappamyces =

Scientific classification
- Domain: Eukaryota
- Kingdom: Fungi
- Division: Chytridiomycota
- Class: Chytridiomycetes
- Order: Rhizophydiales
- Genus: Kappamyces; Letcher & M.J.Powell

Genus of fungi

Kappamyces is a genus of fungi belonging to the family Kappamycetaceae.

The species of this genus are found in Southeastern Asia and Australia.

Species:

- Kappamyces laurelensis Letcher & M.J.Powell
