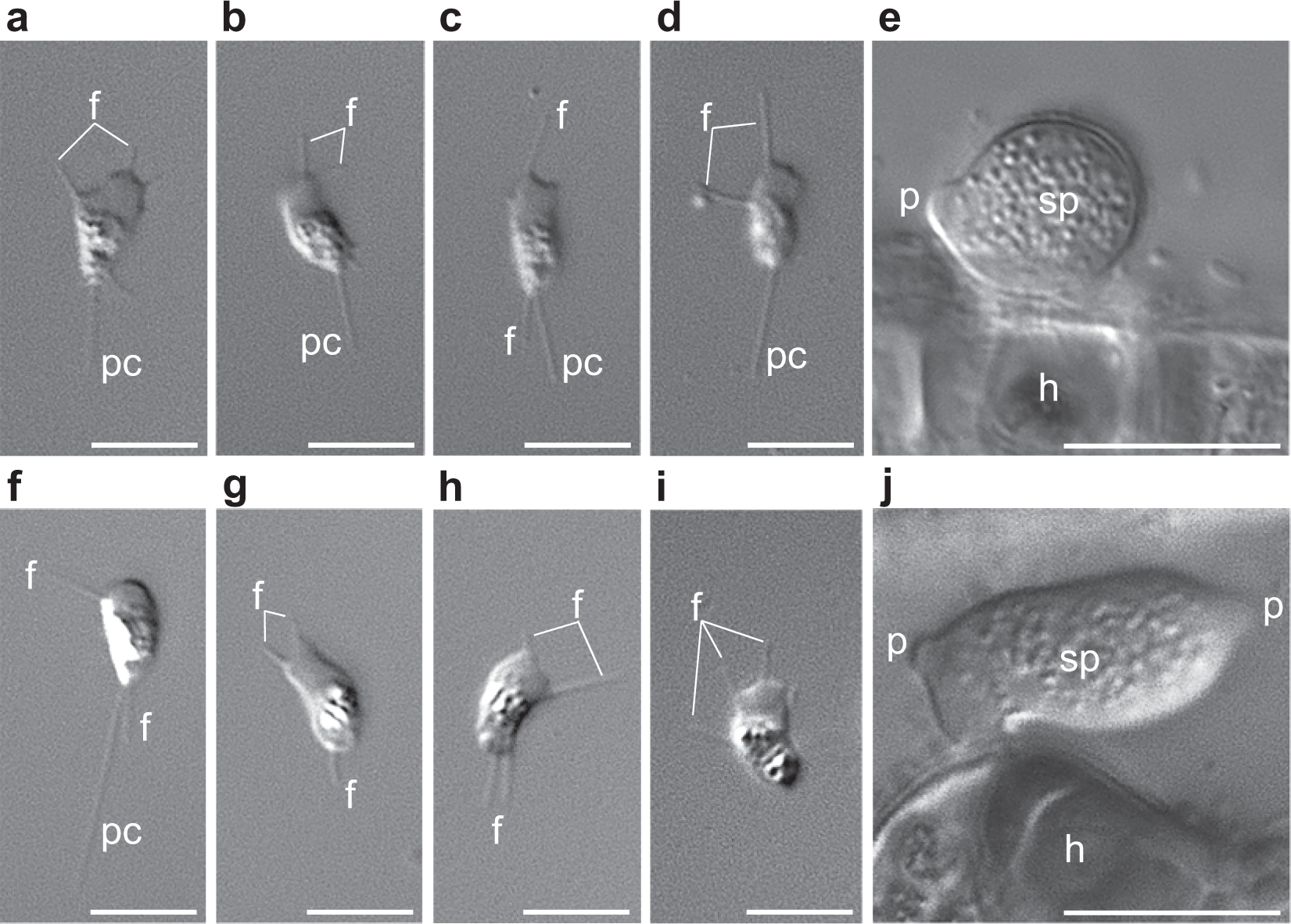
- Sanchytrid cells

Scientific classification
- Kingdom: Fungi
- Division: Sanchytriomycota; Galindo et al., 2021
- Class: Sanchytriomycetes; Tedersoo et al., 2018
- Order: Sanchytriales; Tedersoo et al., 2018
- Family: Sanchytriaceae; Karpov et al., 2017

Genera
- Sanchytrium; Sanchytrium tribonematis; Amoeboradix; Amoeboradix gromovi

Synonyms
- No synonyms

= Sanchytriaceae =

Family of unicellular, parasitic fungi

Sanchytriaceae is a family of fungi containing only two species: Sanchytrium tribonematis and Amoeboradix gromovi. This family is contained within the monotypic taxa of Sanchytriomycota, Sanchytriomycetes, and Sanchytriales. The species are unicellular parasitic fungi living inside algal cells, and are characterized by zoospores with an unusually long kinetosome. The names of these taxa comes from their similarity to chytridiomycetes.

== Description ==
Sanchytrids are chytrid-like parasites with a highly reduced flagellum. The zoospores are also equipped with an unusually long kinetosome. The kinetosome is composed of single or double microtubules, instead of the triplets seen in other eukaryotes. The sporangia are spherical, ovate, or pear-shaped, epibiotic, and have one to three discharge papillae.

One strain of Sanchytrium has zoospores with a posterior filopodium many times the length of the spore. Apart from this variation, it is similar to previously studied S. tribonematis and is not considered a separate species.

== Ecology ==
They are parasites sharing many similarities in life cycle with blastocladiomycetes and chytrids. Both known species in the phylum are parasites on the yellow-brown alga Tribonema gayanum, though they have been grown on other similar algae in laboratory conditions. After the zoospores attach to the living host cell and form cysts, they use a short, branched rhizoid to penetrate the algal cell wall. The mature fungal cell disrupts the contents of the algal cell.

It is cosmopolitan in freshwater habitats. It was originally described from Russia.

Unlike other zoospores, sanchytrids do not use their posterior flagellum for swimming; instead, they use pseudopods to glide along surfaces in an amoeba-like fashion. The spores have both thin filopodia extending in all directions and a single larger anterior pseudopodium.

== Taxonomy ==
The phylum was described in 2021 and contains the two monotypic genera Sanchytrium and Amoeboradix. It is the sister clade to Blastocladiomycota.

== History ==
The family Sanchytriaceae was described in 2017 by Karpov and Aleoshin together with the type genus Sanchytrium and the type species Sanchytrium tribonematis. It was originally placed in the order Monoblepharidales (class Monoblepharidomycetes, phylum Chytridiomycota). This placement was due to morphological similarities with chytrids, although genetically it appeared to belong within Monoblepharidales. As the only parasite in this order, it was placed in its own family.

It was later moved to incertae sedis status at the same time as a second species in a new genus was described (Amoeboradix gromovi). Comparison between the two genera showed similar reductions in genome and morphology, confirming a close relationship. Tedersoo et al. placed it in its own class and order in 2018, and it was later moved to its own phylum, Sanchytriomycota.

== Evolution ==
Almost all early-diverging fungal taxa are zoosporic. In terrestrial fungi, the zoosporic stage has been lost. Sanchytriomycota has evolved to have a smaller genome than other known fungi, even compared to other parasitic zoosporic fungi, and represents a highly diverged parasite. The loss of multiple flagellar components, resulting in a lack of motile flagella, is suggested as a step toward complete reduction of the flagellum, which has occurred in several other clades. It has also been proposed that the flagellum has been retained as a light-sensitive organelle.
