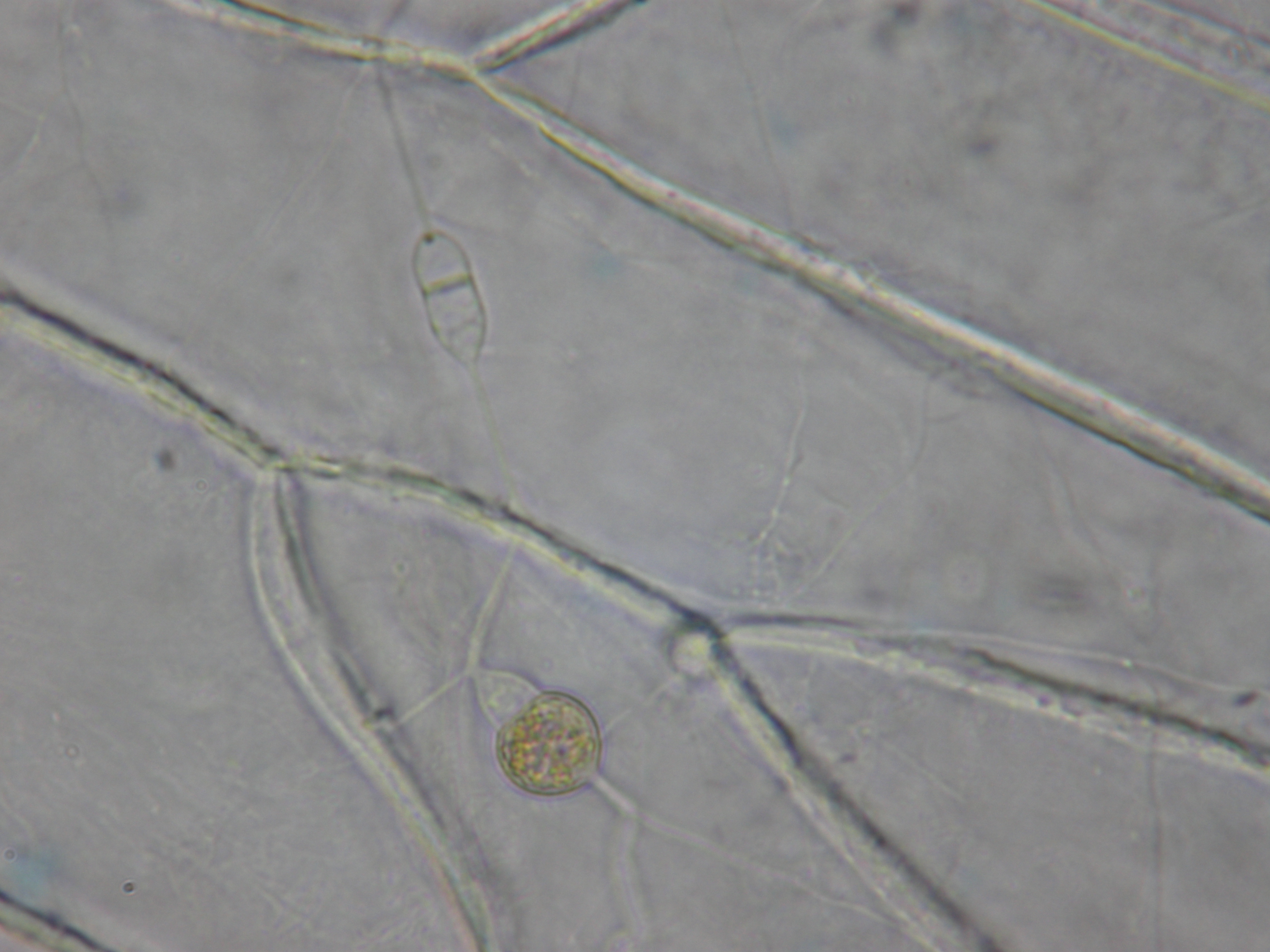
- Orange zoosporangium and tubinate cell of Cladochytrium replicatum growing on onion epidermis.

Scientific classification
- Domain: Eukaryota
- Kingdom: Fungi
- Division: Chytridiomycota
- Class: Cladochytriomycetes
- Order: Cladochytriales
- Family: Cladochytriaceae
- Genus: Cladochytrium; Nowak. (1877)

Species
- Many, including: Cladochytrium tenue

= Cladochytrium =

Genus of fungi

Cladochytrium is a genus of fungi. It is the type genus of the family Cladochytriaceae.

Names brought to synonymy

- Cladochytrium alfalfae, a synonym for Physoderma alfalfae, a plant pathogen that causes crown wart of alfalfa
- Cladochytrium elegans, a synonym for Nowakowskiella elegans
