= Catenochytridium =

Scientific classification
- Domain: Eukaryota
- Kingdom: Fungi
- Division: Chytridiomycota
- Class: Cladochytriomycetes
- Order: Cladochytriales
- Family: Endochytriaceae
- Genus: Catenochytridium; Berdan (1939)

Type species
- Catenochytridium carolinianum Berdan (1939)

Species
- C. carolinianum; C. hemicysti; C. kevorkianii; C. laterale; C. marinum; C. oahuense

Genus of fungi

Catenochytridium is a genus of fungi in the family Endochytriaceae. The genus contains six species known from Japan and North America.
