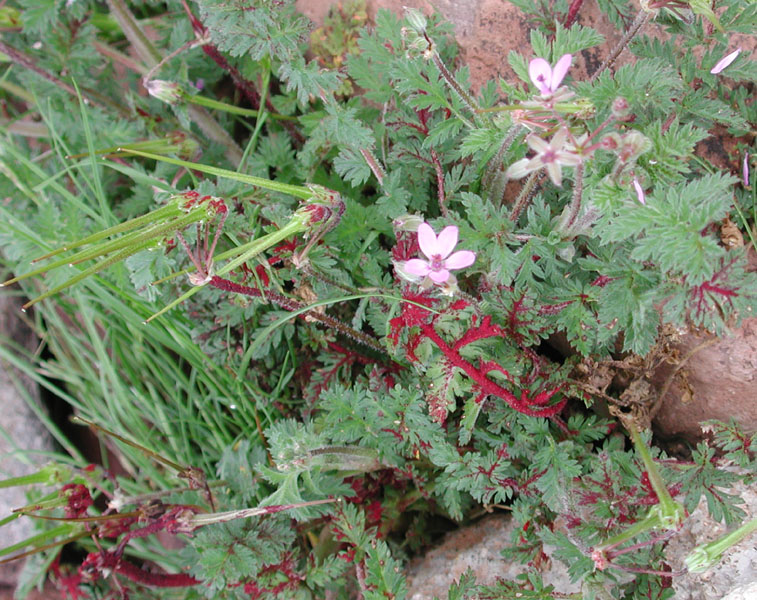
- Synchytrium (prob. S. papillatum) infection of Erodium cicutarium at Lookout Mountain, Phoenix, Maricopa Co., Arizona, USA.

Scientific classification
- Kingdom: Fungi
- Division: Chytridiomycota
- Class: Chytridiomycetes
- Order: Synchytriales
- Family: Synchytriaceae
- Genus: Synchytrium de Bary and Woronin, 1863

Species
- Synchytrium anemones; Synchytrium aureum; Synchytrium decipiens; Synchytrium endobioticum; Synchytrium erieum; Synchytrium fragariae; Synchytrium liquidambaris; Synchytrium mercurialis; Synchytrium stellariae; Synchytrium succisae; Synchytrium taraxaci; Synchytrium urticae

= Synchytrium =

Genus of fungi

Synchytrium is a large genus of plant pathogens within the phylum Chytridiomycota. Species are commonly known as false rust or wart disease. Approximately 200 species are described, and all are obligate parasites of angiosperms, ferns, or mosses. Early species were mistakenly classified among the higher fungi (Ascomycota or Basidiomycota) because of their superficial similarity to the rust fungi. Anton de Bary and Mikhail S. Woronin recognized the true nature of these fungi and established the genus to accommodate Synchytrium taraxaci, which grows on dandelions, and S. succisae, which grows on Succisa pratensis. Synchytrium taraxaci is the type of the genus. The genus has been divided into 6 subgenera based on differences in life cycles.

== Morphology ==
Members of Synchytrium are endobiotic, holocarpic, and inoperculate. This means Synchytrium species grow inside of the host cell (endobiotic), produce structures other than a zoosporangium (holocarpic), and do not release zoospores through a lid-like structure (inoperculate). Zoospores of other members of Chytridiomycota typically give rise to one zoosorangium or a polycentric thallus capable of producing many zoosporangia. In Synchytrium, the zoospore nucleus divides many times with each daughter nucleus giving rise to a zoosporangium. This produces a cluster of clonal zoosporangia, often enveloped with a membrane. This cluster is called a sorus. The zoospore can give rise to the sorus directly or it can act as a prosorus. The difference is demonstrated in the life cycle, which is discussed below.

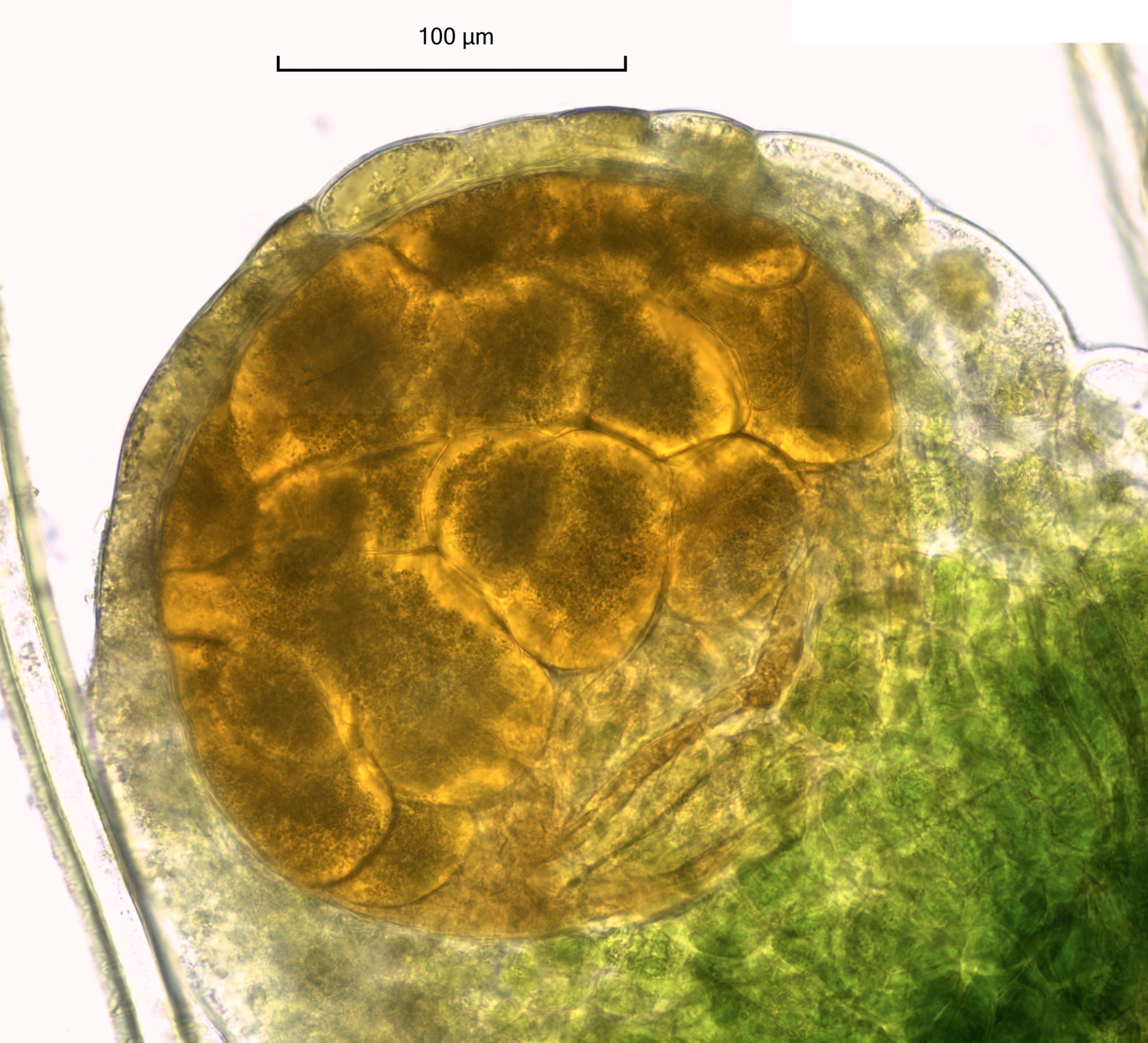
A sorus of Synchytrium aureum from a leaf of Ranunculus acris under ×400 magnification (composite image). The central golden yellow structure is a single swollen plant mesophyll cell filled with multiple sporangia. It is surrounded by plant epidermal cells above, with other mesophyll cells below.

== Life cycle ==
Most species share the same initial developmental stages. The released zoospores swim until they find a suitable host and will occasionally use amoeboid movement to better orient themselves to a host plant cell. After the zoospore attaches to a host cell, a narrow germ tube forms and penetrates the host cell, which is usually an epidermal cell. An exception to this is S. minutum; it uses the stomata to enter the host plant and penetrate a sub-epidermal cell. After penetration, the zoospore cytoplasm flows into the host cell. The Synchytrium nucleus travels toward the host cell nucleus and becomes enveloped in host cytoplasm. After this point, differences arise among Synchytrium species. Species fall into one of two broad categories: short cycled and long cycled. Short cycled species follow one of two lines of development: sori, sporangia, zoospore or resting spore, sori, zoospore. Long cycled species follow a general pathway of prosori/sori, sporangia, zoospore, resting spore, prosori/sori, sporangia, zoospore. The nuances in life cycles are used to delineate the subgenera.

=== Microsynchytrium ===
Species in this subgenus are long cycled and begin as a uninucleate thallus that functions as a prosorus. Basically, the primary nucleus of the parasite grows within the host cytoplasm. At a point, it will produce a new germ tube and exits out of the envelope. It then divides numerous times with each daughter nucleus partitioned into a developing sporangium. An envelope forms around the cluster of sporangia and the cluster becomes a sorus. The sporangia release zoospores that infect other cells. These develop into resting spores that will overwinter. Upon germination, the resting spores function as prosori. Karling included the genus Micromyces within this subgenus while other authors do not.

=== Mesochytrium ===
Species in this subgenus develop in a similar fashion as those in subgenus Microsynchytrium, except that the resting spore functions as a sporangium during germination. In these species, the zoospores can develop into either a prosori, as in Microsynchytrium, or they can fuse to form a flagellated zygote. The zygote infects a host cell and becomes a resting spore. Synchytrium endobioticum is included in this subgenus.

=== (Eu)Synchytrium ===
This subgenus is referred to as Synchytrium or Eusynchytrium. Species in this group do not form prosori. The sorus forms directly from the zoospore nucleus. Several generations can be produced during the spring and summer. Resting spores are developed in the fall and winter. Upon germination, the resting spore acts as a sporangium. The type, Synchytrium taraxaci, is placed in this subgenus.

=== Exosynchytrium ===
These species develop in a similar fashion as Eusynchytrium except that the resting spore acts as a prosorus upon germination.

=== Pycnosynchytrium ===
This subgenus is a "dumping ground" for species with incompletely known life cycles. It would seem that the primary nucleus forms a resting spore that acts as a prosorus upon germination. However, these species will need to be more closely examined for proper placement.

=== Woroniella ===
Species in this group are short cycled. The zoospore nucleus forms a sorus. Resting spores are either unknown or truly absent.

To date, sexual reproduction is only described in four species: Synchytrium endobioticum, S. fulgens, S. macroporosum, and S. psophocarpi.

== Ecology ==
Synchytrium species have been reported from various habitats, from the tropics to the arctic regions. Three species, S. lacunosum, S. potentille, and S. gei, are alpine in nature and have been reported to occur abundantly up to 11,500 feet. Synchytrium potentille zoospores have even been observed swimming in melted snow.

Outbreaks of Synchytrium typically occur in moist environments, such as temporary swamps, frequently inundated meadows, and ditches. The environment of the host plant always determines the frequency and intensity of infection. Infection often occurs during the seedling stage and usually produces galls on the host plant. These galls can be the result of the infected cell enlarging or a combination of enlargement of the infected cell with the enlargement and division of neighboring cells. Infections are not usually destructive with the noted exceptions of Synchytrium endobioticum, S. vaccinii, S. sesamicola, S. oxalydis, S. geranii, and S. cookii.

As in other members of Chytridiomycota, dispersal through the zoospore is limited to the immediate environment of the host cell. Long range dispersal can be achieved through other stages. For example, sporangia of Synchytrium psophcarpi can be transported 15 meters (49 feet) by the wind with maximum dispersal occurring in the afternoon. Sporangia can also be transported from plant to plant through rain splashing. The resting spores of Synchytrium endobioticum have been found stuck to window panes of a building downwind of infected fields, and further study revealed the wind depositing resting spores at a rate of 1 spore/cm^{2}/day. Synchytrium resting spores can be long lived. For example, the resting spore of S. endobioticum remains viable for 30 or more years. Other species are not quite as long. Synchytrium macroporosum resting spores are only viable for several years. Typically, resting spores are the overwintering stage. However, in species that do not produce resting spores, other structures serve as the overwintering stage. For example, two species common to North America, Synchytrium decipiens and S. macroporosum, appear to overwinter as sori on vegetative material.

In terms of hosts, the genus ranges from specific to broad. For example, Synchytrium decipiens and Syncytrium mercurialis are limited to a single host species. Synchytrium taraxaci is limited to the genus Taraxacum. Synchytrium fulgens is able to infect a variety of plants in the family Oenotheraceae. On the other extreme, Synchytrium macroporosum is able to infect 1300 species across 800 genera and 165 plant families. Synchytrium aureum is able to infect 186 species across 110 genera in 33 families. In the last two species, these infections occurred under greenhouse conditions and the life cycle was not always completed.

== Species of economic interest ==
Most species of Synchytrium infect wild plants and rarely affect human affairs. However, there are exceptions. The most well-known species is Synchytrium endobioticum, a parasite of Solanaceae; it is the causal agent of black wart in potatoes. Synchytrium anemones can cause harm to anemone and thalictrum flowers. Synchytrium aureum infects many agricultural and horticultural plants. Synchytrium vaccinii creates galls on cranberry, azalea, chamaedaphne, gaultheira, and ledum. Synchytrium fragariae infects strawberry plants. Synchytrium trichosanthidis parasitizes an Indian cucurbit, and S. sesamicola is responsible for losses in Indian crops of sesame (Sesamum indicum). Synchytrium psophocarpi is one of the major diseases affecting winged bean (Psophocarpus tetragonolobus), which is important high protein crop. Synchytrium pogostemonis is the casual agent of budok (which translates as wart in a local Indonesian language), a disease of Patchouli (Pogostemon cablin). Synchytrium solstitiale parasitizes the yellow star thistle (Centaurea solstitialis), an important weed in the United States. For this reason, S. solstitiale is being considered as a biological control of the yellow star thistle in the United States. Another species being considered for biological control use is Synchytrium minutum, which occasionally parasitizes kudzu. However, S. minutum parasitizes cultivated kudzu patches more often than wild patches and has also been reported from agricultural crops.

== Taxonomy and phylogeny ==
Species in this group are distinguished from one another based on morphology of the various life cycle stages, differences in cytology, both the cytological reaction and gross reaction of the host plant to infection, and the host plant. However, similar to other members of Chytridiomycota, all of these features exhibit considerable variation and often overlap between species. It is possible that many species names refer to the same organism. In some cases, there is not enough variation, and it is possible that one name refers to a species complex. An example is Synchytrium aureum; as mentioned above, it is able to infect a broad range of hosts. However, cross inoculation experiments reveal that strains demonstrate considerable host range restrictions, which implies the presence of cryptic species. A recent study using molecular characters placed Synchytrium endobioticum and two other species outside of Chytridiales. They were sister to the Lobulomycetales, which suggests the genus likely represents a distinct order within Chytridiomycota. However, the study did not contain S. taraxaci, the type, and so refrained from making taxonomic changes. A more recent study has included the type along with those other species. So far, the genus is monophyletic as are several of the subgenera. Two subgenera were non-monophyletic: Pycnosynchytrium and Microsynchytrium. The study also found deep divergences and fast evolution rates in the genus, which is to be expected under Red Queen dynamics.
