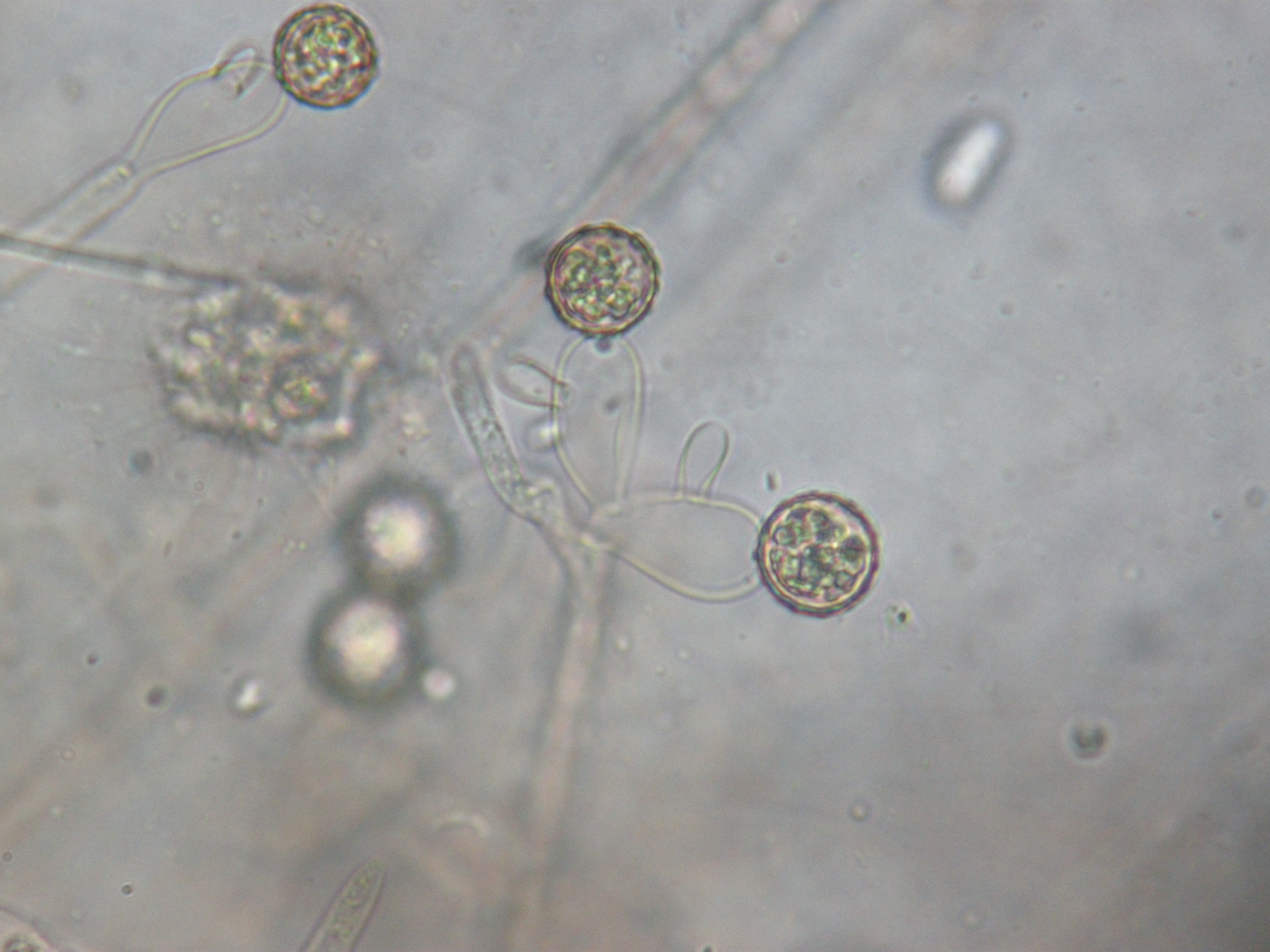
- Monoblepharis polymorpha growing on a sesame seed in water collected from a vernal pool near Orono, Maine. Shown are the spiny, brownish resting spores sitting on top the empty oogonia. On the sides of the oogonia are empty antheridia

Scientific classification
- Kingdom: Fungi
- Division: Chytridiomycota
- Class: Monoblepharidomycetes
- Order: Monoblepharidales
- Family: Monoblepharidaceae
- Genus: Monoblepharis; Cornu

= Monoblepharis =

Genus of fungi

Monoblepharis is a genus of fungi belonging to the family Monoblepharidaceae.

The genus has almost cosmopolitan distribution.

== Species ==
Species:

- Monoblepharis bullata Perrott
- Monoblepharis fasciculata Thaxt.
- Monoblepharis hypogyna Perrott
- Monoblepharis insignis Thaxt.
- Monoblepharis laevis (Sparrow) Sparrow
- Monoblepharis macranda
- Monoblepharis macrandra (Lagerh.) Woronin
- Monoblepharis micrandra Sparrow
- Monoblepharis ovigera Lagerh.
- Monoblepharis polymorpha Cornu
- Monoblepharis regignens Lagerh.
- Monoblepharis sphaerica Cornu
- Monoblepharis thalassinosa M.K.Elias
