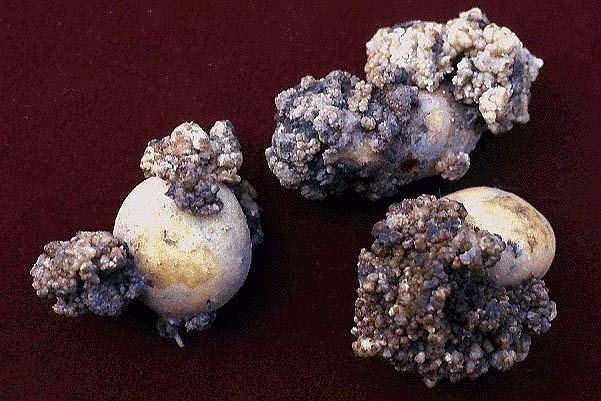

Scientific classification
- Kingdom: Fungi
- Division: Chytridiomycota
- Class: Chytridiomycetes
- Order: Synchytriales
- Family: Synchytriaceae
- Genus: Synchytrium
- Species: S. endobioticum

Binomial name
- Synchytrium endobioticum (Schilb.) Percival (1909)

Synonyms
- Chrysophlyctis endobiotica Schilb. (1896)

= Synchytrium endobioticum =

Species of fungus

Synchytrium endobioticum is a chytrid fungus that causes the potato wart disease, or black scab. It also infects some other plants of the genus Solanum, though potato is the only cultivated host.

== Systematics ==
Traditionally, Synchytrium endobioticum has been placed to the subgenus Mesochytrium, but it has been suggested that, on the basis of the mode of germination, it should be transferred to the subgenus Microsynchytrium. It was first identified and studied by Vera Charles. The New Zealand scientist Kathleen Maisey Curtis also studied Synchytrium endobioticum for her doctoral thesis that, in 1919, resulted in her being recognised as producing groundbreaking research on the organism's pathology.

At least 18 pathotypes of the fungus exist, most of which have quite limited ranges in Central Europe. The most widely distributed is pathotype 1.

== Morphology ==
Like some other Chytridiales, Synchytrium endobioticum develops no mycelium. The fungus produces a thick walled structure known as a winter sporangium. It is 25-75 μm in diameter and contains 200-300 spores. Sporangia are clustered into thin-walled sori. The motile life stage, zoospore is about 0,5 μm in diameter and has one posterior flagellum.

== Life cycle ==
In spring, at higher temperature and moisture, overwintering sporangia germinate to release motile zoospores which infect suitable host epidermal cells. In infected cells, the summer sporangia develop, which quickly release new populations of zoospores. The infection cycle may be repeated as long as infection conditions are suitable. The infected plant cells swell, divide and surround the dividing zoospores resulting in the wart.

Under certain stress conditions some zoospore pairs fuse, resulting in a zygote. The zygote bearing host cells divide, forming eventually the walls of a new winter sporangium. In autumn, the warts rot and disintegrate, releasing new thick-walled resting spores of the fungus into the soil. The diploid resting spores (pro-sori) undergo a dormancy period and before germination (probably) a meiotic division and several mitotic divisions, becoming a sorus.

== Ecology ==
Synchytrium endobioticum is an obligate parasite that infects several plants of the genus Solanum. The most favourable conditions for its development are warm temperatures (but not over 20 °C) with enough humidity. Winter sporangia can remain viable for up to 20–30 years. It can survive at depths of 50 cm in the soil. Three different fungi have been observed to parasitize the resting sporangia.

S. endobioticum originates from the Andean region of South-America, with almost worldwide distribution in areas where potatoes are cultivated (absent in most of tropical Africa, Middle East, most of Canada, Japan and Australia).

== Environment ==
Cool and wet soils are conducive to potato wart disease development. While there are discrepancies in the reported temperatures for maximal potato wart infection, summers with an average temperature of 18 °C or less, winters below 5 °C, and annual precipitation of 700 mm or more are considered to be favorable for the disease. Soil pH does not appear to be associated with disease occurrence; S. endobioticum infections have been reported in soils with pH ranging from 3.9-8.5.

Overwintering sporangia of S. endobioticum are extremely resilient. Dry sporangia can survive at 100 °C for 11–12 h, composting for 12 days at 60– 65 °C, pasteurization for 90 min at 70 °C, the digestive system of animals feeding on infected tubers, as well as treatment in 1% formaldehyde and 0.1% mercuric chloride for one hour and three hours, respectively. A soil temperature of at least 8 °C and water is required for sporangia germination and the dispersal of zoospores. The microelements B, Cu, Zn, and Mo, have been reported to induce the germination of sporangia following overwintering.

== Management ==
The resilient nature of the resting spores, the overwintering sporangia, is the principal challenge in managing the disease. Several means of control have been explored, including chemical and biological, but have been largely ineffective, impractical, or neglected. Cultivation of resistant varieties is the best management approach. However, the development of resistant varieties is challenged by the discovery of novel pathotypes and the polygenic nature of resistance to potato wart. Despite these challenges, legislative action has been taken that leverages the use of resistant varieties and has effectively curtailed the spread of potato wart. This action enforces the demarcation of contaminated plots and safety zones and the disposal of infected potato material. Safety zones are areas where only resistant varieties can be grown, and potatoes cannot be grown in sites until the absence of sporangia can be demonstrated. These legislative efforts also include measures that forbid the trade of infected potatoes and the presence of the disease in potato seed production.

== Pathogenesis ==
Very little is known about the pathogenesis of S. endobioticum at a molecular level. Indeed, this is true of chytrids more generally, excepting a few well-studied species. However, recent genome sequencing and annotation of S. endobioticum has shed light on the potential molecular mechanisms of pathogenesis. For example, this analysis demonstrated the coding capacity of S. endobioticum to process complex sugars, which may include cellulose and starch. However, genes for cell wall degrading hemicellulases are reduced in S. endobioticum relative to the closely related, saprophytic chytrid, S. microbalum. The lack of hemicellulases may allow the pathogen to evade defense responses triggered by damage-associated molecular patterns from cell wall degradation. Several regions within the genome have been identified as possible effector coding regions, but further work will need to be done to verify this. S. endobioticum did not contain genes coding for enzymes that are crucial to the biosynthesis of purine and pyrimidine. It is probable S. endobioticum exacts purine and pyrimidine from its host.

== Legal ==
Added to the United States' federal bioterrorism list for agricultural plant pathogens in 2002, in accordance with the Public Health Security and Bioterrorism Preparedness Response Act.

== Outbreaks ==
In late 2021, the discovery of the fungus in two potato fields on Prince Edward Island in Canada, led the country to ban potato exports from PEI to the United States.

== Sources ==
- EPPO data sheet on S. endobioticum
- Resting-spore germination in Synchytrium endobioticum
- Germination and parasitation of the resting sporangia of Synchytrium endobioticum
- About potato wart disease
