= Cladochytriaceae =

Scientific classification
- Kingdom: Fungi
- Division: Chytridiomycota
- Class: Cladochytriomycetes
- Order: Cladochytriales
- Family: Cladochytriaceae; J.Schröt. (1892)

Type genus
- Cladochytrium Nowak. (1877)

Genera
- Cladochytrium

Family of fungi

The Cladochytriaceae are a family of fungi in the order Cladochytriales.

== Taxonomy ==
According to a 2008 estimate, the family contained 10 genera and 38 species. However, the 2022 taxonomy of fungi places only one genus, Cladochytrium, making the family monotypic.

Regarding the genera previously included, Amoebochytrium and Septochytrium were moved into their separate families, Saccopodium was moved into its separate order, and Megachytrium remains uncertain within the class Chytridiomycetes.
