= Endochytrium =

Scientific classification
- Domain: Eukaryota
- Kingdom: Fungi
- Division: Chytridiomycota
- Class: Cladochytriomycetes
- Order: Cladochytriales
- Family: Endochytriaceae
- Genus: Endochytrium; Sparrow (1933)

Type species
- Endochytrium oophilum Sparrow (1933)

Species
- E. cystarum; E. digitatum; E. multiguttulatum; E. oophilum; E. operculatum; E. pseudodistomum; E. ramosum

Genus of fungi

Endochytrium is a genus of fungi in the family Endochytriaceae. The genus is widespread in temperate regions, and contains seven species.
