= Olpidium =

Scientific classification
- Kingdom: Fungi
- Order: Olpidiales
- Family: Olpidiaceae
- Genus: Olpidium (A.Braun) J.Schröt.

Type species
- Olpidium endogenum (A. Br.) Schroet.

Synonyms
- Chytridium (Olpidium) Braun 1856; Asterocystis de Wildeman 1893 non Gobi 1879; Cyphidium Magnus 1875; Diplochytridium Karling 1971; Diplochytrium Tomaschek 1878; Endolpidium de Wildeman 1894; Olpidiaster Pascher 1917 non Saccas 1954; Olpidiella Lagerheim 1888

Genus of fungi

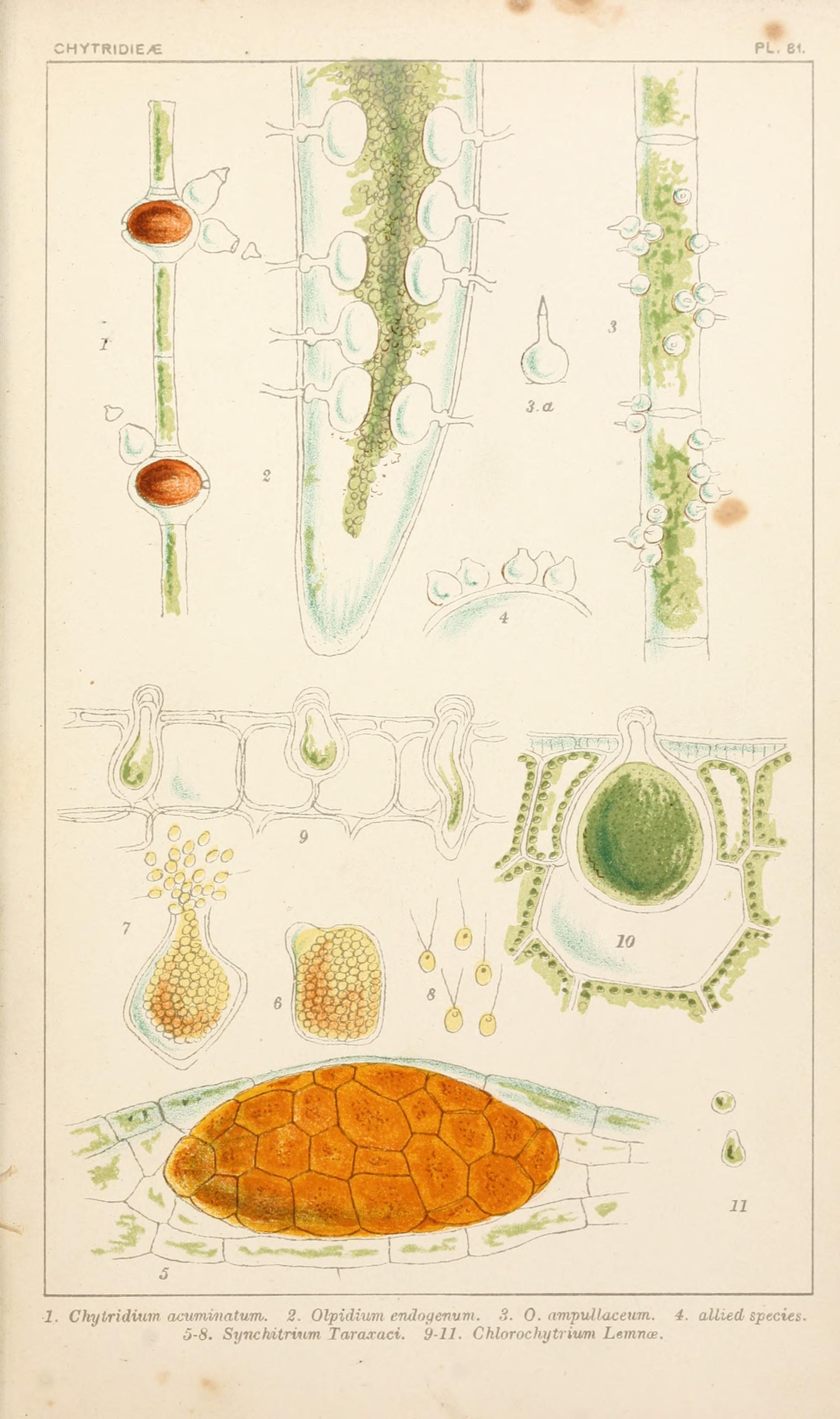
British fresh-water algae, Figure 2. Olpidium endogenum

Olpidium is a fungal genus in the family Olpidiaceae. Members of Olpidium are zoosporic pathogens of plants, animals, fungi, and oomycetes.

== Morphology ==
Olpidium species exist as spherical zoosporangia inside the cells of their host. Zoospores emerge from a single discharge tube and have a single, posterior whiplash flagellum. Resting spores can be smooth or ornamented.

== Ecology ==
Olpidium species infect a wide variety of plants, animals, protists, and fungi and are fairly common in aquatic and terrestrial ecosystems. Most of what is known about the genus comes from those species that infect higher plants, especially crops.

In higher plants, infection with Olpidium often causes little to no symptoms. An exception is Olpidium viciae, which causes broadbean blister. However, Olpidium species can vector plant viruses. For example, Olpidium brassicae transmits big-vein virus and big-vein associated varicosavirus among lettuce plants, and transmits tobacco mosaic virus among tobacco plants. Olpidium bornovanus or Olpidium cucurbitacearum serves as a vectors for a number of curcubit viruses.

== Taxonomy ==
The genus Olpidium was placed in the Olpidiaceae in the Chytridiales. Later some species, notably O. brassicae, were moved to the genus Pleotrachelus, but these were later moved back into the genus. Based on zoospore ultrastructure, Donald J. S. Barr moved the genus into Spizellomycetales In studies using molecular phylogenetics, O. brassicae, O. virulentus, and O. bornovanus were found to cluster with members of the former Zygomycota not with members of Chytridiomycota. One researcher, has elevated Olpidium to the level of phylum (Olpidiomycota) and split the genus into several genera. While nomenclaturaly valid and accepted by some researchers, others view these changes as controversial and unsupported.
