= O. brassicae =

O. brassicae may refer to:

- Olpidium brassicae, a plant pathogen
- Orobanche brassicae, a herbaceous plant
