= Hyaloraphidium =

Scientific classification
- Domain: Eukaryota
- Kingdom: Fungi
- Phylum: Monoblepharomycota
- Class: Hyaloraphidiomycetes; Doweld, 2001
- Order: Hyaloraphidiales; Doweld, 2001
- Family: Hyaloraphidiaceae; Doweld, 2001
- Genus: Hyaloraphidium; Pascher & Korshikov, 1931

Type species
- Hyaloraphidium curvatum Pascher & Korshikov 1931

Species
- H. curvatum

Genus of fungi

Hyaloraphidium is a genus of chytrid-like fungi. It is the only member of the family Hyaloraphidiaceae, order Hyaloraphidiales and class Hyaloraphidiomycetes in the division Monoblepharomycota.

The genus has almost cosmopolitan distribution.

Species:

- Hyaloraphidium contortum Pascher & Korshikov
- Hyaloraphidium curvatum Korshikov
