= Olpidium brassicae =

Scientific classification
- Domain: Eukaryota
- Kingdom: Fungi
- Family: Olpidiaceae
- Genus: Olpidium
- Species: O. brassicae

Binomial name
- Olpidium brassicae (Woronin) P.A. Dang., Annls Sci. Nat., Bot., sér. 7: 327 (1886)

Synonyms
- Asterocystis radicis De Wild., (1893); Chytridium brassicae Woronin, (1878); Olpidiaster radicis (De Wild.) Pascher; Pleotrachelus brassicae (Woronin) Sahtiy., (1962)

Species of fungus

Olpidium brassicae is a plant pathogen, it is a fungal obligate parasite. In 1983, the Alsike, Alberta area's clover (which is a major part of horses' diet) was struck by a fungus epidemic of Olpidium brassicae, previously not seen in Canada.

== Vector ==
O. brassicae is the fungal vector for most, if not all, necroviruses.
