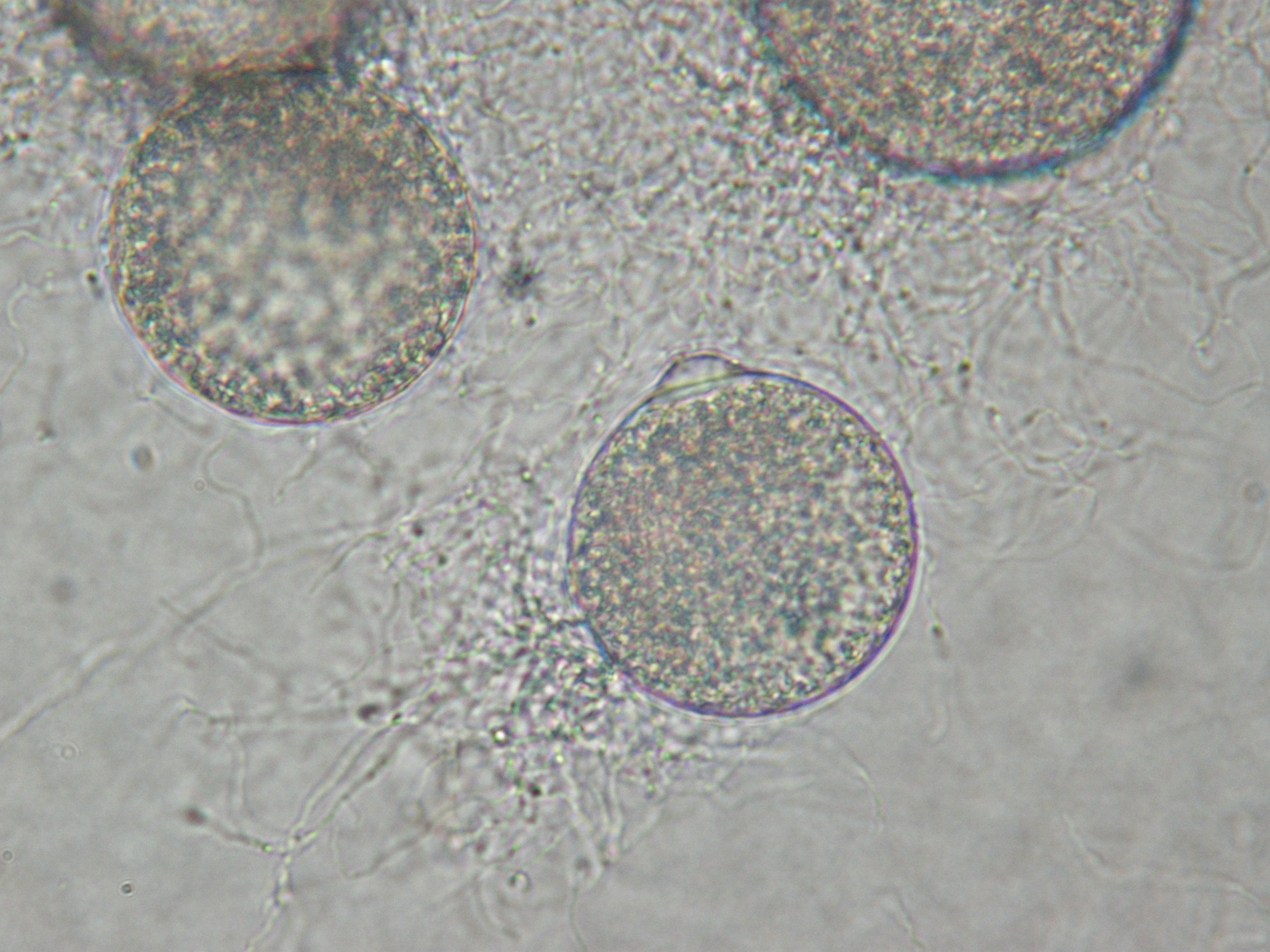
- A member of Rhizophydiales growing on nutrient agar. Note the discharge papillae near the 12 o'clock position.

Scientific classification
- Kingdom: Fungi
- Division: Chytridiomycota
- Class: Chytridiomycetes
- Order: Rhizophydiales; Letcher 2006

Type species
- Rhizophydium globosum Schenk 1858

= Rhizophydiales =

Order of fungi

Rhizophydiales are an important group of chytrid fungi. They are found in soil as well as marine and fresh water habitats where they function as parasites and decomposers.

== Role in the environment ==
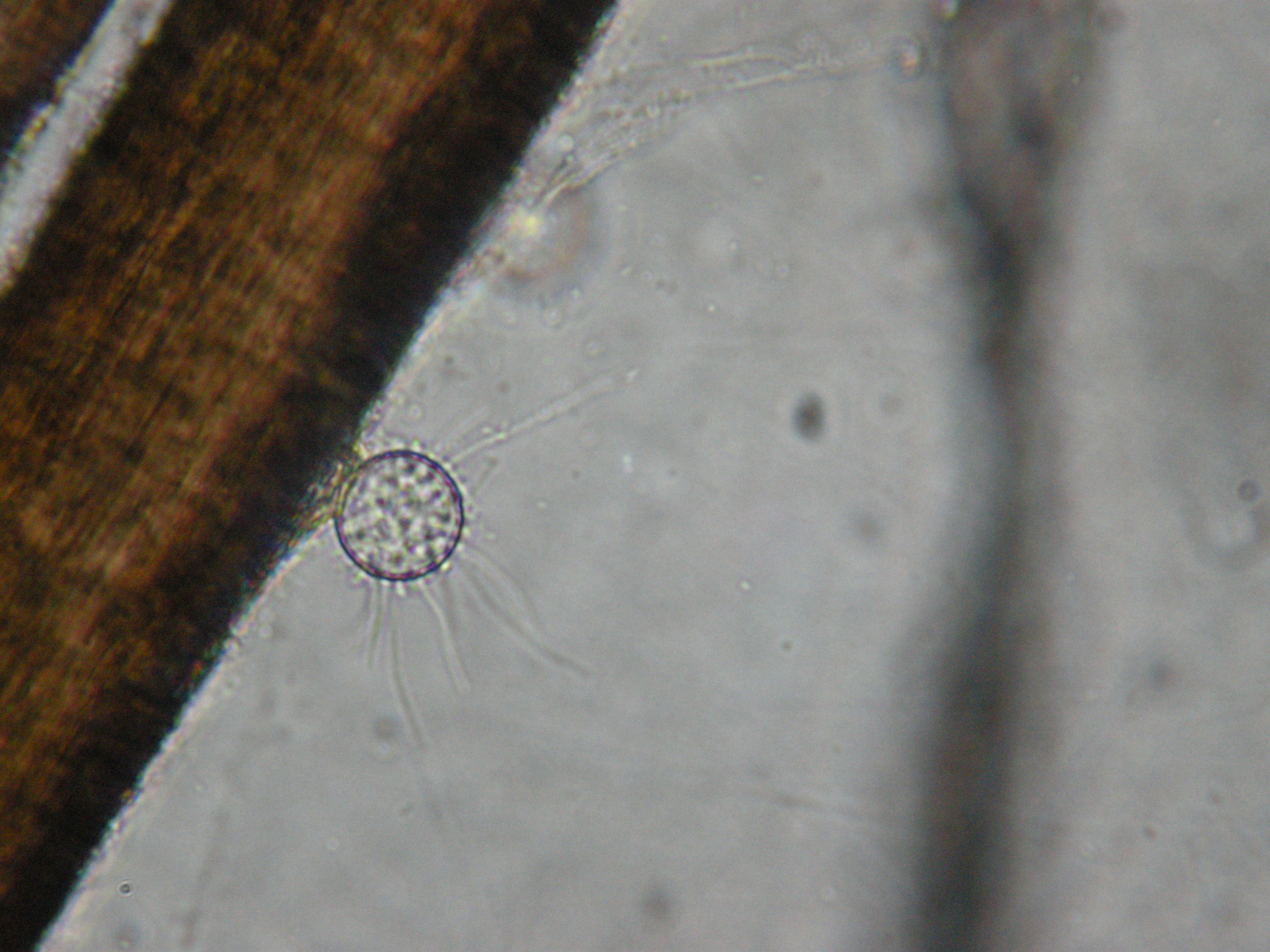
Rhizophydium keratinophilum zoosporangium with characteristic spines growing on human hair.

Rhizophydiales are parasites of a range of organisms, including invertebrates, other chytrids and algae, and they may have a role in natural control of aquatic populations, especially phytoplankton. One member, Rhizophydium graminis, is a parasite of wheat roots, but causes no extensive damage to the plant. The only documented cases of a chytrid parasitizing vertebrates are Batrachochytrium dendrobatidis and Batrachochytrium salamandrivorans, members of this order. They are highly destructive pathogens of frogs and salamanders respectively.

The majority of the described saprotrophic species of this order are biodegraders of pollen, with only a few growing on keratin, chitin, and cellulose. The transformational role of the Rhizophydiales in aquatic food webs is little studied but recently more recognized.

== Life history ==
Their thalli (=bodies) consist of two parts: an absorptive branching rhizoidal system that contains no nuclei and a multinucleate sporangium that ranges in shape from spherical, to oval, to pear-shaped, and to multi-lobed. The rhizoids attach the thallus to a substrate (food source) and absorbs nutrients. When the thallus is fully grown, the sporangium releases numerous, unwalled, uninucleate-zoospores, each bearing a single posteriorly directed flagellum.

The zoospore has to use its own stored food reserves (lipids and glycogen) as it swims until it attaches to a suitable host or substrate, absorbs its flagellum, produces a wall around itself, grows a germ tube that penetrates the substrate, and develops into a new thallus. Zoospores of parasitic chytrids use light and chemical cues to locate hosts. Zoospores of Rhizophydium littoreum, a parasite of marine green algae, are positively phototactic toward blue light, a mechanism that might assure that zoospores swim to the photic zone where its host resides. Zoospores of both R. littoreum and B. dendrobatidis exhibit chemotaxis to specific sugars, proteins and amino acids, also a mechanism by which zoospores might detect signals to potential hosts.

Sexual reproduction is more rarely reported and occurs when two adjacent sporangia function as gametangia with one transferring all of its cytoplasmic contents into the other, resulting in the development of a thick-walled, lipid-laden resting spore.

== Phylogeny ==
Based on the work of "The Mycota: A Comprehensive Treatise on Fungi as Experimental Systems for Basic and Applied Research", Powell and Letcher 2015

- Rhizophydiales
  - - Gorgonomycetaceae Letcher 2006
    - - - Kappamycetaceae Letcher 2006
        - Alphamycetaceae Letcher 2008
      - - - Halomycetaceae Letcher & Powell 2015
          - - Protrudomycetaceae Letcher 2008
            - - Angulomycetaceae Letcher 2008
              - Aquamycetaceae Letcher 2008
        - - Terramycetaceae Letcher 2006
          - - Dinomycetaceae Karpov & Guillou 2014
            - - Coralloidiomycetaceae Doweld 2014
              - - Uebelmesseromycetaceae Powell & Letcher 2015
                - - Operculomycetaceae Doweld 2014
                  - - Batrachochytriaceae Doweld 2013
                    - - Globomycetaceae Letcher 2008
                      - - Pateramycetaceae Letcher 2008
                        - Rhizophydiaceae Werderm. 1954

== Taxonomic classification ==
The Rhizophydiales is an order of fungi that includes the following families and genera:

- Aquamycetaceae Letcher 2008
  - Aquamyces Letcher 2008
- Alphamycetaceae Letcher 2008
  - Alphamyces Letcher 2008
  - Betamyces Letcher 2012
  - Gammamyces Letcher 2012
- Angulomycetaceae Letcher 2008
  - Angulomyces Letcher 2008
- Batrachochytriaceae Doweld 2013
  - Batrachochytrium Longcore, Pessier & D.K. Nichols 1999 (no clear relatives known in 2007)
  - Homolaphlyctis Longcore, Letcher & T.Y. James 2011
- Coralloidiomycetaceae Doweld 2014
  - Coralloidiomyces Letcher 2008
- Dinomycetaceae Karpov & Guillou 2014
  - Dinomyces Karpov & Guillou 2014
- Globomycetaceae Letcher 2008
  - Globomyces Letcher 2008
  - Urceomyces Letcher 2008
- Gorgonomycetaceae Letcher 2008
  - Gorgonomyces Letcher 2008
- Halomycetaceae Letcher & Powell 2015
  - Halomyces (Amon) Letcher & M.J. Powell 2015
  - Paludomyces Letcher & M.J. Powell 2015
  - Paranamyces Letcher & M.J. Powell 2015
  - Ulkenomyces Letcher & M.J. Powell 2015
- Kappamycetaceae Letcher 2006
  - Kappamyces Letcher & M.J. Powell 2005
- Operculomycetaceae Doweld 2014
  - Operculomyces M.J.Powell, Letcher & Longcore 2011
- Pateramycetaceae Letcher 2008
  - Pateramyces Letcher 2008
- Protrudomycetaceae Letcher 2008
  - Protrudomyces Letcher 2008
- Rhizophydiaceae Werderm. 1954 [Tylochytriaceae Doweld 2014]
  - Rhizophydium Schenk 1858
- Staurastromycetaceae Van den Wyngaert et al. 2017
  - Staurastromyces Van den Wyngaert et al. 2017
- Terramycetaceae Letcher 2006
  - Boothiomyces Letcher 2006
  - Terramyces Letcher 2006
- Uebelmesseromycetaceae Powell & Letcher 2015
  - Uebelmesseromyces Powell & Letcher 2015

== Biodiversity ==
New species and genera are still being discovered in this order. A member of this order, Kappamyces, was the first phylogenetic genus of a chytrid circumscribed based primarily on monophyly demonstrated in molecular sequence analysis and confirmed with unique zoospore structure Coralloidiomyces digitatus defied the original view held that the thallus of members of the Rhizophydiales was conservative. Collected from submersed mud at the edge of an oligotrophic lake in southern Argentina near the Andes in Patagonia, C. digitatus has a thallus with a sporangium shaped like a coral.
