= Nowakowskiella =

Scientific classification
- Kingdom: Fungi
- Division: Chytridiomycota
- Class: Cladochytriomycetes
- Order: Cladochytriales
- Family: Nowakowskiellaceae; Sparrow ex S.E.Mozley-Standridge (2009)
- Genus: Nowakowskiella; J.Schröt. (1893)

Type species
- Nowakowskiella elegans (Nowak.) J.Schröt. (1893)

Genus of fungi

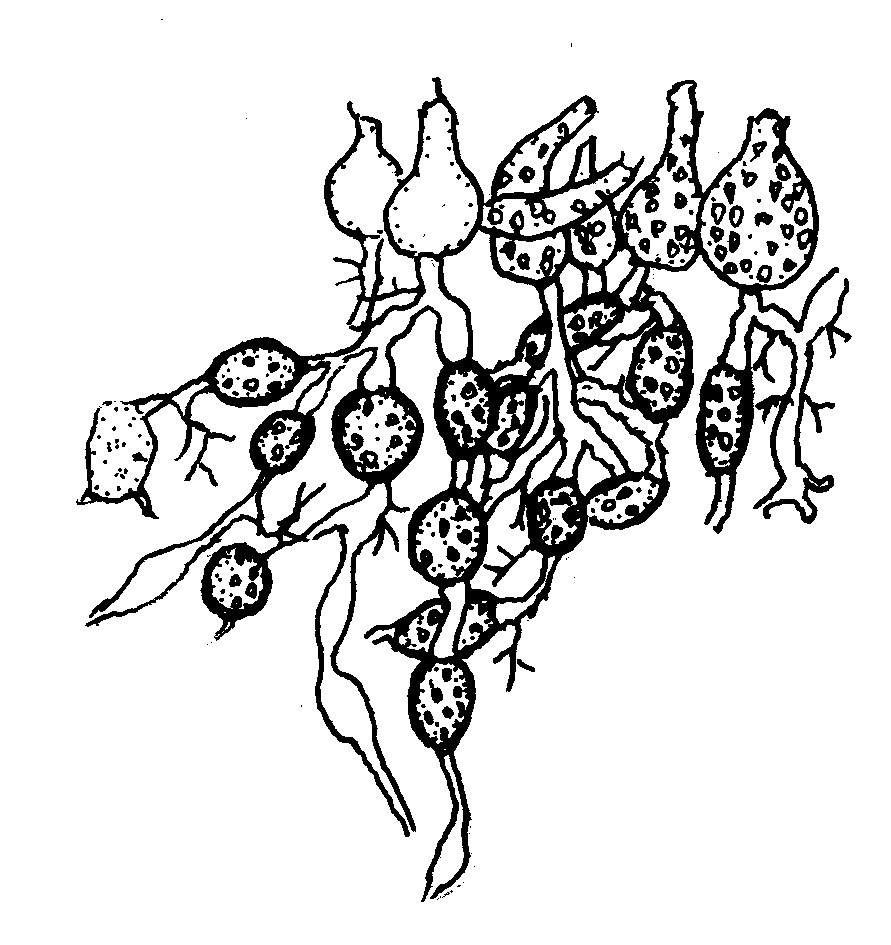
Nowakowskiella multispora

Nowakowskiella is the sole genus of fungi in the family Nowakowskiellaceae. The genus was circumscribed by German mycologist Joseph Schröter in 1897, while the family was originally circumscribed by Frederick Kroeber Sparrow in 1942, and then published validly in 2009.

The genus name of Nowakowskiella is in honour of Leon Nowakowski (1847–1918), who was a Polish naturalist and botanist (Algology and Mycology) from Warsau.

The genus was published in Nat. Pflanzenfam. (Engler & Prantl) vol.1 (Issue1) on pages 77, 82 and 134 in 1897.

== Species ==
As accepted by GBIF;

- Nowakowskiella atkinsii Sparrow
- Nowakowskiella crassa Karling
- Nowakowskiella crenulata G.H.Jerônimo & Pires-Zottar.
- Nowakowskiella delica Whiffen
- Nowakowskiella elegans (Nowak.) J.Schröt.
- Nowakowskiella endogena Const.
- Nowakowskiella hemisphaerospora Shanor
- Nowakowskiella keratinophila Hassan & A.Batko
- Nowakowskiella macrospora Karling
- Nowakowskiella methistemichroma A.Batko & Hassan
- Nowakowskiella moubasherana Hassan
- Nowakowskiella multispora Karling
- Nowakowskiella pitcairnensis Karling
- Nowakowskiella profusa Karling
- Nowakowskiella ramosa E.J.Butler
- Nowakowskiella sculptura Karling
