= Mikhail Stepanovich Voronin =

Russian biologist

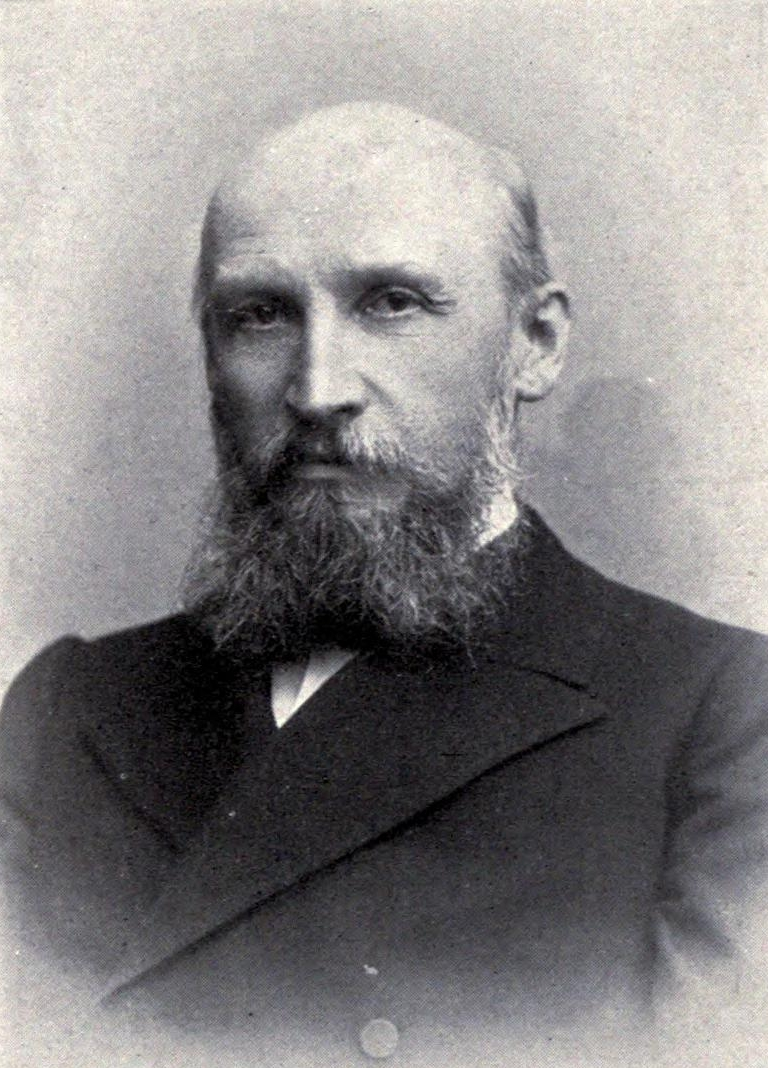
Mikhail Voronin

Mikhail Stepanovich Voronin, also Woronin (Russian: Михаи́л Степа́нович Воро́нин; 21 June 1838 – 20 February 1903) was a prominent Russian biologist, a botanist with particular expertise in fungi.

== Education ==
Voronin was born in St Petersburg on 21 June (2 July/August old calendar) 1838 into the family of a rich merchant, which was subsequently ennobled. He received an excellent home education. One of his teachers was Nikolay Chernyshevsky (still a student, but later to become a famous Russian writer). M.S. Voronin had a perfect command of three foreign languages: French, German and English.

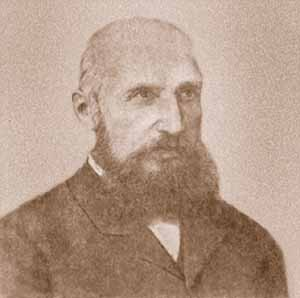

In 1854 Voronin entered Saint Petersburg State University in the Department of Natural Sciences. Professor Lev Semionovich Tsenkovsky excited in him an interest in investigating the lower plants, among which fungi were placed that time. In 1858 he graduated from the University, after which, according to the recommendation of Tsenkovsky, he went with his friend, A.S. Famintsyn, to probation to Freiburg University (Germany) to Professor de Bary.

Although de Bary intensively investigated fungi, he suggested that Voronin study anatomical peculiarities of the shrub, Calycanthus. Voronin's first scientific article, published in the journal "Botanische Zeitung" (1860) was devoted to this question. Later on friends were introduced to the renowned algologist, G. Ture, who proposed that Voronin investigate phases of development of the Mediterranean alga, Acetabularia. M.S. Voronin thoroughly studied the ontogenesis of Acetabularia and demonstrated that it was the initial stage in the developmental cycle of other forms of algae. As a result, a large amount of experimental data was accumulated, which underlay Voronin's master's dissertation "Investigations of sea algae". He successfully defended this work in St Petersburg University in May 1861.

== Early career ==
Still working in Freiburg, Voronin decided to devote himself to the investigation of fungi. After taking a Master's degree in botany he refused a paying position at the University, because he did not want to be diverted from his scientific investigations. The means of his family allowed him not only to subsist comfortably, but to establish an equipped scientific laboratory at home. In this laboratory he started his first investigation on fungi, dealing with the bread mould, Monilia. The work turned out to be very complicated and it became necessary to consult with de Bary.

In 1863 he went to Freiburg, where he worked on the peculiarities of mould development. He studied in passing also some other fungi. His work was interrupted when he had to return to St Petersburg after the sudden death of his father. Then he continued his investigations which helped to restore mental balance. After studying the ontogenesis of mucoraceous moulds on bread, Voronin decided to investigate the developmental cycle of typical representatives of different groups of fungi. His attention was attracted by Archimycetes, in particular representatives of the genus Synchytrium, parasites of vascular plants. The same group of fungi fell into the sphere of interests of de Bary. In the course of correspondence the two scientists agreed to carry on collaborative investigations.

At the same time Voronin took a great interest in another subject - tubercles on lupin roots. A thorough investigation revealed the cause of these structures' formation. On numerous microscope sections it was observed, that the cells of tubercles were filled with rod-like bacteria, which Voronin called "root nodule bacteria". After experimentation, he demonstrated the possibility of artificial inoculation of lupin roots, and then also roots of the alder tree, by nodule bacteria. He came to the conclusion that bacteria, like fungi, could cause plant diseases.

But his interest in fungi was still strong. Living now on the outskirts of St. Petersburg along with his family Voronin often made excursions to nearby forests. During one of these excursions he noticed red spots on the upper side of some leaves of cowberry. After investigating thousands of plants with similar spots on their leaves, Voronin was able to describe a new species - Exobasidium vaccinii. On the basis of this fungus, a new family and order of fungi was established. Investigation of Exobasidium on the cowberry was carried on in the classic manner: developmental phases of the species were studied in detail, different sensitivities of flowers and leaves to the fungus was established and correlation between the age of plant and its receptivity was revealed. Later on this work underlay the teaching on immunity in plants.

In the summer of 1866 Voronin went abroad with his family and continued work with de Bary. They wrote a book together, "Materials on morphology and physiology of fungi" (in German), which became one of the fundamental books about fungi.

In the spring of 1867 Voronin returned to Russia, where he continued his scientific work and also actively participated in scientific-public life. Voronin repeatedly was a sponsor of his alma mater: endowed the building of a greenhouse in the Botanical Garden of the University, refused the salary of senior lecturer (from 1869 to 1870 he lectured mycology at St Petersburg University) in favour of purchasing of study aids for the botanical laboratory.

In 1868 in St Petersburg the Naturalists Society was organized into three departments (botanical, zoological and mineralogical). Voronin was elected as a secretary of the Botanical Department. On periodic meetings of the department he reported the results of his investigations, introduced synopses of works of foreign scientists on fungi, algae and lichens, and also on general problems of biology, and he participated in discussions of the reports of other members of the society. As a result Voronin struck up many of interesting scientific contacts both with venerable Russian scientists and with scientific youth. At the Second Meeting of Naturalists and Physicians of Russia (August, 1869, Moscow) Voronin was elected the secretary of the section of botany, anatomy and physiology of plants.

However his scientific work always remained foremost for Voronin. At the end of the 1860s and beginning of the 1870s his attention was attracted by two practical scientific problems: rust of the sunflower and club root. In 1868-1869 this disease achieved menacing amplitude in Russia, in particular in Voronezh province. The "Agricultural Newspaper" appealed to Voronin for help. He immediately commenced an investigation of the pest, studied its life cycle, established the presence of summer and winter (autumn) spores, revealed that spreading of the fungus agent as well as the disease caused by it are promoted by thickness of planting and non-observance of crop rotation. Based on this example of rust on sunflowers, Voronin formulated major rules of the mass spreading of fungal diseases of plants.

At the same time (1869) near St Petersburg and other north-western regions of Russia club root disease began to spread. The losses of transporters were so significant, that the Russian Society of Horticulturists in 1872 announced a competition to reveal the cause of this disease. M.S. Voronin succeeded, showing that it was the slime mold Plasmodiophora brassicae.

== Later career ==
In 1874 Voronin was elected honorary member of the Moscow Naturalists Society. In 1875, the Council of New Russia University (Odessa) conferred him the degree of Doctor of Botany honoris causa. However Voronin continued his investigation of Plasmodiophora brassicae - an organism with an intricate developmental cycle. During the period from 1873 to 1878 he published six articles on the agent and the disease. The Russian Society of horticulturists in 1878 awarded him a gold medal for his investigations of the club root.

In 1877-1878 Voronin lived abroad, but after his wife's death he predominantly devoted himself to the education of his children. And only after returning to Russia, did he begin a new cycle of investigations on the biology and classification of smut fungi. These fungi had attracted his interest as early as 1865, when he managed to collect Tuburcinia trientalis on the outskirts of St Petersburg. 16 years after, in 1881, he published his summarized work on smut fungi in Frankfurt in "Transactions of Zenkenberg Naturalists Society". De Bary used Voronin's materials on smut fungi in his variant of natural classification of fungi.

The life and activity of Voronin were tightly bound with the life and activity of his preceptor and friend - A. de Bary. So, when in October 1880 Strasburg University celebrated the 25th anniversary de Bary's professorship, Voronin took part in the celebration and brought, as a present, the new species of alga named after de Bary - Vaucheria debaryana. On the occasion of this celebration, where the pick of European botanists were assembled, his colleagues saw M.S. Voronin and his role in the development of mycology in a new light. As a result, in 1881 the Vienna Botanical Society elected him as an honorary member, in 1882 the Russian Academy of Sciences conferred him with the Academician Ber Prize, in 1883 the Berlin Naturalists Society elected him as a corresponding member, and finally, in 1884 he was elected corresponding member of the Russian Academy of Sciences.

Voronin's attention was attracted by new unstudied problems of mycology. In the 1880s he concentrated on an investigation of fungi of the genus Sclerotinia, which remained his favourite object of study until the end of his life. Voronin studied developmental cycles, described new species of this genus on bilberries, cowberries, great bilberries, cranberries, and investigated Sclerotinia on bird tree and mountain ash.

In 1898 Voronin established the relationship between anamorphs of the genus Monilia on cherry and seed fruit trees, and teleomorphs of the genus Sclerotinia. He dedicated his main work on Sclerotinia, "On Sclerotinia, affected plants of genus Vaccinium," (1888) to his teacher and friend A. de Bary, who died in January 1888.

In 1889 the head of the Emigrant Department of South-Ussuriysk Territory of Russia, F.F. Busse, made a request to M.S. Voronin to discover the cause of a widespread and dangerous disease in the territory called "tempulent corn" or scab. Voronin received numerous specimens of affected cereal plants and he began his investigation. He found numerous species of fungi on affected ears, ranked them by extent of potential harm for human and animals and then singled out two the most probable initiators of the disease (it turned out subsequently that they were two stages of the same fungus). Comparing the intensity of manifestation of disease with meteorological data in the territory, Voronin came to the conclusion that the agent of scab developed intensively in rainy and warm weather when harvested cereals were stacked directly on the ground.

== Honours ==
Voronin was well-known in scientific groups of Europe and America where scientific societies included him among their honorary members. In 1889 he was elected a full member of the Russian Geographical Society, honorary member of the Society of Amateurs in Anthropology and Ethnography in Moscow, in 1894 - honorary member of the Moscow Naturalists Society and the Petersburg Naturalists Society, in 1895 - honorary member of the Russian Society of Horticulture and a foreign member of the Linnaean Society in London. And finally, in 1898, Voronin became an Academician of the Russian Academy of Sciences. In 1899 he was inducted as an honorary member into the Scientific Committee of the Ministry of Agriculture and State Properties, and in the same year he was invited to head the Department of Cryptogam Plants of the Botanical Museum Russian Academy of Sciences, in 1902 he was elected an honorary member of Kharkov and Yuryev Universities.

M.S. Voronin died of pneumonia on 20 February (5 March old calendar) 1903.

== See also ==
- University of Freiburg Faculty of Biology
