= Endochytriaceae =

Scientific classification
- Kingdom: Fungi
- Division: Chytridiomycota
- Class: Cladochytriomycetes
- Order: Cladochytriales
- Family: Endochytriaceae; Sparrow ex D.J.S.Barr (1980)

Type genus
- Endochytrium Sparrow (1933)

Genera
- Allochytridium; Asterophlyctis; Canteria; Catenochytridium; Diplophlyctis; Endochytrium; Endocoenobium; Entophlyctis; Mitochytridium; Nephrochytrium; Truittella

Family of fungi

The Endochytriaceae are a family of fungi in the order Cladochytriales. The family contains 10 genera and 56 species according to a 2008 estimate. It was circumscribed by mycologist Donald J.S. Barr in 1980.
