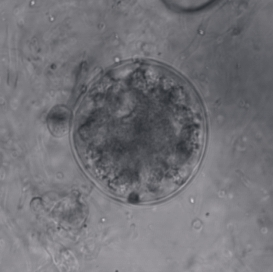

Scientific classification
- Kingdom: Fungi
- Division: Chytridiomycota
- Class: Chytridiomycetes
- Order: Spizellomycetales; D.J.S.Barr (1980)

Families
- Caulochytriaceae; Powellomycetaceae; Spizellomycetaceae

Synonyms
- Caulochytriales Doweld 2014

= Spizellomycetales =

Order of fungi

Spizellomycetales is an order of fungi in the Chytridiomycetes. Spizellomycetalean chytrids are essentially ubiquitous zoospore-producing fungi found in soils where they decompose pollen. Recently they have also been found in dung and harsh alpine environments, greatly expanding the range of habitats where one can expect to find these fungi.

== Role in the environment ==
Spizellomycetalean chytrids have beneficial roles in the soil for nutrient recycling and as parasites of organisms that attack plants, such as nematodes and oospores of downy mildews. On the other hand, they also have detrimental roles as parasites of arbuscular mycorrhizae, symbiotic fungi that help plants gain essential nutrients. Culture isolation studies and molecular characterization of these fungi have demonstrated a great deal of undescribed diversity within the Spizellomycetales, even for isolates collected within the same geographic location. Thus, these understudied fungi await greater exploration.

== Taxonomy ==
The order includes the following genera:

- Family Caulochytriaceae Subramanian 1974
  - Genus Caulochytrium Voos & Olive 1968
- Family Powellomycetaceae Simmons 2011
  - Genus Fimicolochytrium Simmons & Longcore 2012
  - Genus Geranomyces D.R. Simmons 2011
  - Genus Powellomyces Longcore, D.J.S. Barr & Désauln. 1995
  - Genus Thoreauomyces Simmons & Longcore 2012
- Family Spizellomycetaceae Barr 1980
  - Genus Brevicalcar Letcher & M.J. Powell 2017
  - Genus Bulbomyces Letcher & M.J. Powell 2017
  - Genus Gaertneriomyces D.J.S. Barr 1980
  - Genus Gallinipes Letcher & M.J. Powell 2017
  - Genus Kochiomyces D.J.S. Barr 1980
  - Genus Spizellomyces D.J.S. Barr 1980
  - Genus Triparticalcar D.J.S. Barr 1980

== See also ==
- Rozella
