= Leo Roy Tehon =

American mycologist (1895-1953)

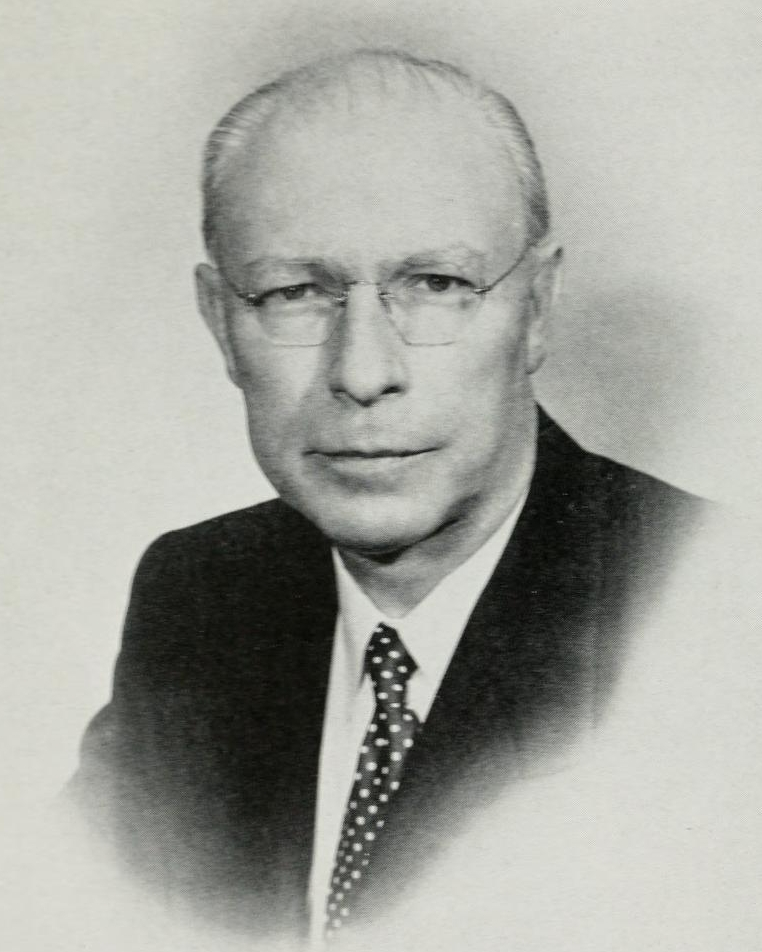

Leo Roy Tehon (21 June 1895 – 5 May 1953) was an American mycologist and plant pathologist. He worked in the Illinois Natural History Survey from 1921 until his death.

== Life and work ==
Tehon was born in Dumont, South Dakota, the son of Irish immigrant Patrick John and Nebraska-born Bertha May Whittier, a relative of the poet John Greenleaf Whittier. The family was poor and after the early death of his father Leo worked in the railways to pay for his schooling. He went to school in Sturgis, South Dakota, Deadwood and Fremont, Nebraska. He went to Fremont Normal School and Gregg School, Chicago before going to the University of Wyoming to receive a BA in 1916. The classes of Aven Nelson attracted him to botany. He studied botany at the University of Illinois. In 1917 he taught botany at Arsenal Technical High School, Indianapolis. He married Mary Viola Bruner in 1918 and they had two children. He served in the infantry in 1918-19 before returning to Illinois where he worked as a plant pathologist in the US Department of Agriculture. He was involved in barberry eradication programs. Barberry was an alternate host of wheat rust. In 1920 he received an MA from the University of Illinois and in 1921 he joined the Illinois Natural History Survey. He received a doctorate from the University of Illinois in 1934 after working under Frank Lincoln Stevens. From 1947 he was also a professor of plant pathology. He described several plant-pathogenic fungi and their control.

Tehon was interested in the history of the pioneers and played the violin. He also studied Italian, translating a work of Tozzetti on fungi. He was active in the Boy Scouts movement.
