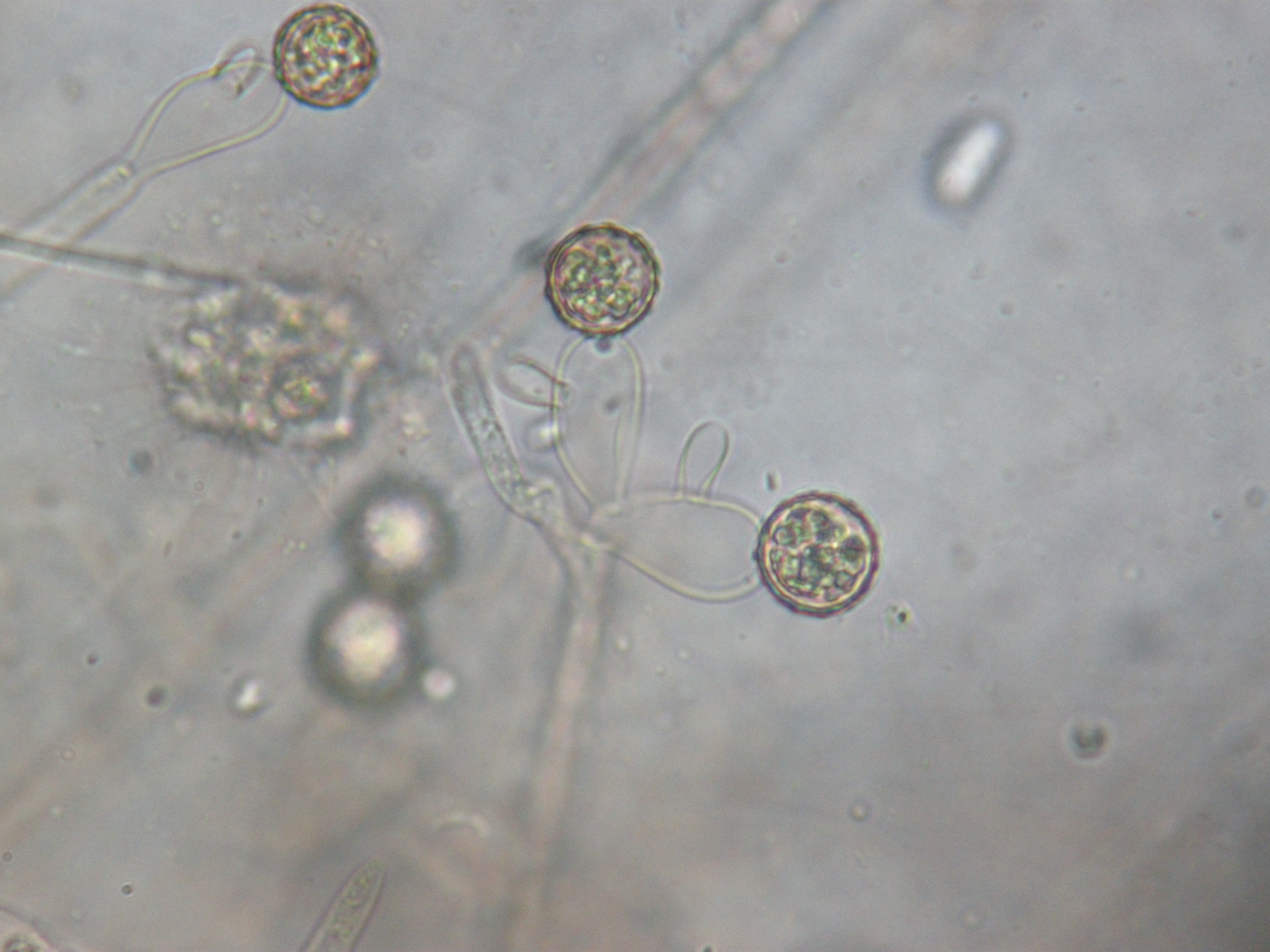
- Monoblepharis polymorpha growing on a sesame seed in water collected from a vernal pool near Orono, Maine. Shown are the spiny, brownish resting spores sitting on top the empty oogonia. On the sides of the oogonia are empty antheridia.

Scientific classification
- Domain: Eukaryota
- Kingdom: Fungi
- Division: Chytridiomycota
- Class: Monoblepharidomycetes; J.H. Schaffner 1909
- Order: Monoblepharidales (J. Schröter 1893) Sparrow 1943

Type species
- Monoblepharis spp. Cornu 1871

Synonyms
- Gonapodyales Jacz. & P.A. Jacz. 1931; Harpochytriales Emerson & Whisler 1968; Monoblepharidineae Schröter 1893; Oedogoniomycetales Doweld 2014

= Monoblepharidomycetes =

Class of fungi

Members of the Monoblepharidomycetes have a filamentous thallus that is either extensive or simple and unbranched. They frequently have a holdfast at the base. In contrast to other taxa in their phylum, some reproduce using autospores, although many do so through zoospores. Oogamous sexual reproduction may also occur.

In addition to the type genus, the order Monoblepharidales includes Harpochytrium and Oedogoniomyces.

== Taxonomy ==
Based on the work of "The Mycota: A Comprehensive Treatise on Fungi as Experimental Systems for Basic and Applied Research" and synonyms from "Part 1- Virae, Prokarya, Protists, Fungi".

- Class Monoblepharidomycetes Schaffner 1909
  - Order Monoblepharidales Schröter 1883
    - Family Gonapodyaceae Petersen 1909
      - Genus Gonapodya Fischer 1892
      - Genus Monoblepharella Sparrow 1940
    - Family Harpochytriaceae Emerson & Whisler 1984
      - Genus Harpochytrium Lagerheim 1890 [Fulminaria Gobi 1900; Rhabdium Dangeard 1903 non Wallroth 1833 non Schrammen 1936 non Schaum 1859]
    - Family Monoblepharidaceae Fischer 1892
      - Genus Monoblepharis Cornu 1871 [Diblepharis Lagerheim 1900; Monoblephariopsis Laibach 1927]
    - Family Oedogoniomycetaceae Barr 1990
      - Genus Oedogoniomyces Kobayasi & Ôkubo 1954
    - Family Telasphaerulaceae Longcore et T.Y. James 2017
      - Genus Telasphaerula Longcore et T.Y. James 2017
