= Olpidiaceae =

Scientific classification
- Kingdom: Fungi
- Subkingdom: Olpidiomyceta
- Division: Olpidiomycota; Doweld
- Subdivision: Olpidiomycotina; Doweld
- Class: Olpidiomycetes; Doweld
- Order: Olpidiales; Caval.-Sm.
- Family: Olpidiaceae; Schröter, 1889

Genera
- Agratia; Chytridhaema; Cibdelia; Leiolpidium; Monochytrium; Olpidiaster; Perolpidium; Schizolpidium; Olpidium

Family of fungi

The Olpidiaceae are a fungal plant pathogen family of genera that are placed in the order Olpidiales.

== Taxonomy ==
Based on the work of Philippe Silar and "The Mycota: A Comprehensive Treatise on Fungi as Experimental Systems for Basic and Applied Research" and synonyms from "Part 1- Virae, Prokarya, Protists, Fungi".

- Phylum Olpidiomycota Doweld 2013 [Olpidiomycotina Doweld 2013]
  - Class Olpidiomycetes Doweld 2013
    - Order Olpidiales Cavalier-Smith 2012
      - Family Olpidiaceae Schröter 1889
        - Genus Agratia Mol. Nov. 2014 [Morella Pérez Reyes 1964 non Loureiro 1790]
        - Genus Chytridhaema Moniez 1887
        - Genus Cibdelia Juel 1925
        - Genus Leiolpidium Doweld 2014
        - Genus Monochytrium Griggs 1910
        - Genus Olpidiaster Saccas 1954 non Pascher 1917
        - Genus Perolpidium Doweld 2014
        - Genus Schizolpidium Doweld 2014
        - Genus Olpidium Rabenhorst 1868 [Chytridium (Olpidium) Braun 1856; Asterocystis de Wildeman 1893 non Gobi 1879; Cyphidium Magnus 1875; Diplochytrium Tomaschek 1878; Olpidiella Lagerheim 1888; Endolpidium de Wildeman 1894; Diplochytridium Karling 1971; Olpidiaster Pascher 1917 non Saccas 1954]
