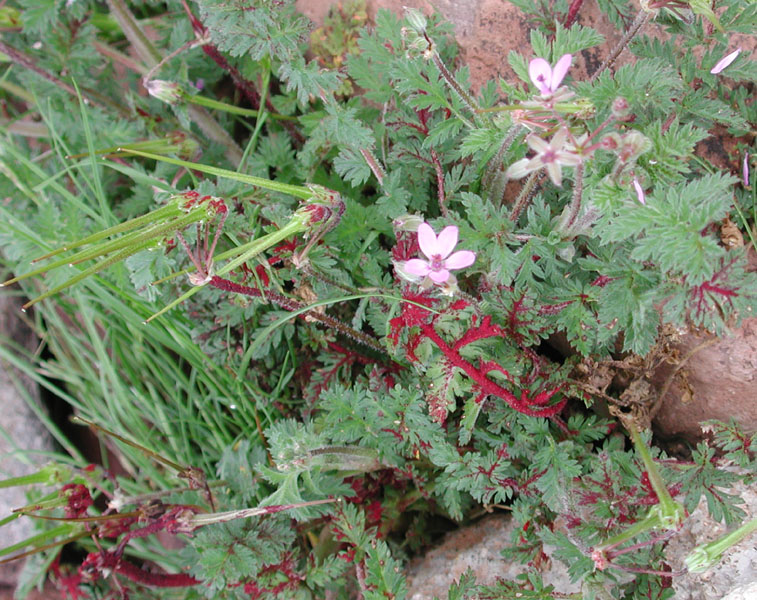
- Synchytrium (prob. S. papillatum) infection of Erodium cicutarium at Lookout Mountain, Phoenix, Arizona, USA

Scientific classification
- Kingdom: Fungi
- Division: Chytridiomycota
- Class: Chytridiomycetes
- Order: Synchytriales; Doweld
- Family: Synchytriaceae; J.Schröt. (1892)

Type genus
- Synchytrium de Bary & Woronin (1865)

Genera
- Carpenterophlyctis; Endodesmidium; Johnkarlingia; Micromyces; Synchytrium

= Synchytriaceae =

Family of fungi

Synchytriaceae is a chytrid fungus family in the division Chytridiomycota. The family was described by German mycologist Joseph Schröter in 1892. The type genus, Synchytrium, contains about 200 species of fungi that are parasitic on flowering plants, ferns, mosses, and algae. Synchytrium endobioticum causes potato wart disease, an economically important disease of cultivated potato.
