= Cladochytriales =

Scientific classification
- Kingdom: Fungi
- Division: Chytridiomycota
- Class: Cladochytriomycetes; Tedersoo et al., 2018
- Order: Cladochytriales; Mozl.-Standr., 2009

Families
- Catenochytridiaceae; Cladochytriaceae; Endochytriaceae; Nowakowskiellaceae; Septochytriaceae; ?Allochytridium; ?Cylindrochytridium; ?Nephrochytrium

Order of fungi

Cladochytriales is an order of chytrid fungi. It is the only order in the monotypic class Cladochytriomycetes. The order was described in 2009 to accommodate a monophyletic clade containing many genera of chytrid fungi often observed growing over decaying plant tissue and other cellulosic substrates from aquatic habitats and humid soils.

== Taxonomy ==
The 2022 taxonomy of fungi places 5 families and 3 uncertain genera in Cladochytriales:

- Family Catenochytridiaceae Doweld, 2014
  - Catenochytridium Berdan, 1939
- Family Cladochytriaceae J. Schröt., 1892
  - Cladochytrium Nowak., 1877
- Family Endochytriaceae Sparrow ex D.J.S. Barr, 1980
  - Diplophlyctis J. Schröt., 1892
  - Endochytrium Sparrow, 1933
- Family Nowakowskiellaceae Sparrow ex Mozl.-Standr., 2009
  - Nowakowskiella J.Schröt., 1893
- Family Septochytriaceae Mozl.-Standr., 2009
  - Septochytrium Berdan, 1939
- incertae sedis
  - Allochytrium Doweld, 2013 (=Allochytridium Salkin, 1970)
  - Cylindrochytridium Karling, 1941
  - Nephrochytrium Karling, 1938
