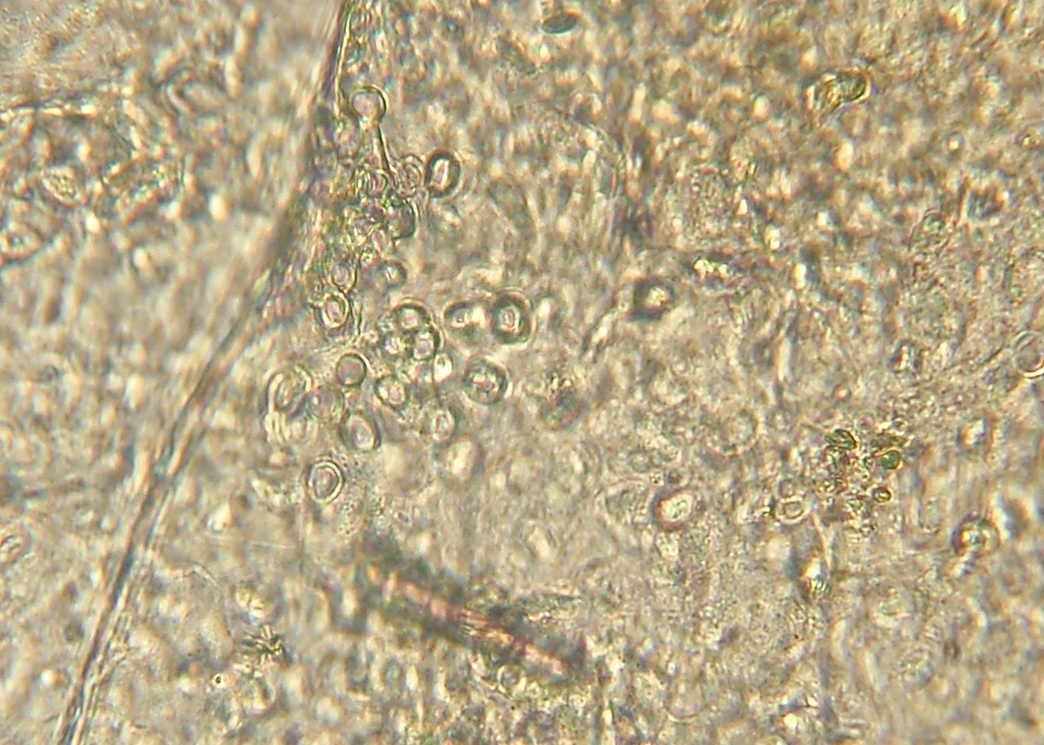
- Chytrid cytology

Scientific classification
- Kingdom: Fungi
- Division: Chytridiomycota
- Class: Chytridiomycetes; Caval.-Sm (1998)

Orders
- Chytridiales; Cladochytriales; Gromochytriales; Lobulomycetales; Mesochytriales; Nephridiophagales; Polychytriales; Polyphagales; Rhizophydiales; Rhizophlyctidales; Saccopodiales; Spizellomycetales; Synchytriales

Synonyms
- Archimycetes Fischer 1892; Chytridiomycetidae Scagel et al. 1965; Rumpomycetes Cavalier-Smith 1987; Rupomycetidae Cavalier-Smith 1998 emend. 2013; Spizomycetidae Cavalier-Smith 1998

= Chytridiomycetes =

Class of fungi

Chytridiomycetes (/kɪˌtrɪdioʊmaɪˈsiːtiːz, -ˈsiːts/) is a class of fungi. Members are found in soil, fresh water, and saline estuaries. They are first known from the Rhynie chert. It has recently been redefined to exclude the taxa Neocallimastigomycota and Monoblepharidomycetes, which are now a phylum and a sister-class respectively.

Chytridiomycetes is the major class of the phylum Chytridiomycota, which contains a number of parasitic species. At least two species in this class are known to infect a number of amphibian species.

== Phylogeny ==
Based on the work of "The Mycota: A Comprehensive Treatise on Fungi as Experimental Systems for Basic and Applied Research", Powell and Letcher 2015 and Karpov et al. 2014.

- - - Synchytriales
      Synchytriaceae Schröter 1892
  - - - - Gromochytriales
          Gromochytriaceae Karpov & Aleoshin 2014
        - Mesochytriales
          Mesochytriaceae Karpov & Aleoshin 2014
      - Lobulomycetales
        - Alogomycetaceae Doweld 2014
        - Lobulomycetaceae Simmons 2009
    - - Polytrichiales
        - Arkayaceae Doweld 2014
        - Polytrichiaceae Longcore & Simmons 2012
      - - - Cladochytriales
            - Catenochytridiaceae Doweld 2014
            - Nowakowskiellaceae Sparrow ex Mozley-Standridge 2009
            - Septochytriaceae Mozley-Standridge 2009
            - Cladochytriaceae Schröter 1892
            - Endochytriaceae Sparrow ex Barr 1980
          - Chytridiales
            - Chytriomycetaceae Letcher 2011
            - Chytridiaceae Nowakowski 1878
        - - - Blyttiomyces Bartsch 1939
            - - Spizellomycetales
                - Caulochytriaceae Subram. 1974
                - Powellomycetaceae Simmons 2011
                - Spizellomycetaceae Barr 1980
              - Rhizophlyctidales
                - Arizonaphlyctidaceae
                - Borealophlyctidaceae
                - Sonoraphlyctidaceae
                - Rhizophlyctidaceae
          - Rhizophydiales
            - Entophlyctis helioformis (Dangeard 1886) Ramsbottom 1916
            - - - Protrudomycetaceae Letcher 2008
                - - Angulomycetaceae Letcher 2008
                  - Aquamycetaceae Letcher 2008
              - - - Kappamycetaceae Letcher 2006
                  - - Gorgonomycetaceae Letcher 2006
                    - Alphamycetaceae Letcher 2008
                - - Terramycetaceae Letcher 2006
                  - - Dinomycetaceae Karpov & Guillou 2014
                    - - Coralloidiomycetaceae Doweld 2014
                      - - Uebelmesseromycetaceae Powell & Letcher 2015
                        - - Operculomycetaceae Doweld 2014
                          - - Batrachochytriaceae Doweld 2013
                            - - Batrachochytriaceae Doweld 2013
                              - Globomycetaceae Letcher 2008
                              - - Pateramycetaceae Letcher 2008
                                - Rhizophydiaceae Werderm. 1954
