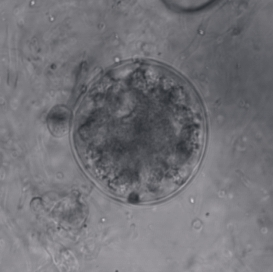
- Sporangium of a spizellomycete

Scientific classification
- Kingdom: Fungi
- Division: Chytridiomycota; Hibbett et al. (2007)

Classes and orders
- Chytridiomycetes; Chytridiales; Rhizophydiales; Polychytriales; Rhizophlyctidales; Polyphagales; Cladochytriomycetes; Cladochytriales; Lobulomycetes; Lobulomycetales; Mesochytriomycetes; Gromochytriales; Mesochytriales; Monoblepharidomycetes; Monoblepharidales; Harpochytriales; Hyaloraphidiomycetes; Hyaloraphidiales; Sanchytriomycetes; Sanchytriales; Spizellomycetes; Spizellomycetales; Synchytriomycetes; Synchytriales

= Chytridiomycota =

Division of fungi

Chytridiomycota are a division of zoosporic organisms in the kingdom Fungi, informally known as chytrids. The name is derived from the Ancient Greek χυτρίδιον (khutrídion), meaning "little pot", describing the structure containing unreleased zoospores. Chytrids are one of the earliest diverging fungal lineages, and their membership in kingdom Fungi is demonstrated with chitin cell walls, a posterior whiplash flagellum, absorptive nutrition, use of glycogen as an energy storage compound, and synthesis of lysine by the α-amino adipic acid (AAA) pathway.

Chytrids are saprobic, degrading refractory materials such as chitin and keratin, and sometimes act as parasites. There has been a significant increase in the research of chytrids since the discovery of Batrachochytrium dendrobatidis, the causal agent of chytridiomycosis.

== Classification ==
Species of Chytridiomycota have traditionally been delineated and classified based on development, morphology, substrate, and method of zoospore discharge. However, single spore isolates (or isogenic lines) display a great amount of variation in many of these features; thus, these features cannot be used to classify or identify a species reliably. Currently, taxonomy in Chytridiomycota is based on molecular data, zoospore ultrastructure and some aspects of thallus morphology and development.

In an older and more restricted sense (not used here), the term "chytrids" referred just to those fungi in the class Chytridiomycetes. Here, the term "chytrid" refers to all members of Chytridiomycota.

The chytrids have also been included among the Protoctista, but are now regularly classed as fungi.

In older classifications, chytrids, except the recently established order Spizellomycetales, were placed in the class Phycomycetes under the subphylum Myxomycophyta of the kingdom Fungi. Previously, they were placed in the Mastigomycotina as the class Chytridiomycetes. The other classes of the Mastigomycotina, the Hyphochytriomycetes and oomycetes, were removed from the fungi to be classified as heterokont pseudofungi.

The class Chytridiomycetes has over 750 chytrid species distributed among ten orders. Additional classes include the Monoblepharidomycetes, with two orders, and the Hyaloraphidiomycetes with a single order.

Molecular phylogenetics and other techniques such as ultrastructure analysis have greatly increased the understanding of chytrid phylogeny and led to the formation of several new zoosporic fungal phyla:

- The order Blastocladiales, originally within the Chytridiomycota, are now classified as a separate phylum, the Blastocladiomycota.
- The Neocallimastigales, originally an order of anaerobic fungi of the class Chytridiomycetes, found in the digestive tracts of herbivores, was later raised to a separate phylum, the Neocallimastigomycota.
- The Olpidiaceae, including the type genus Olpidium, formerly classified in the order Chytridiales, were raised to a separate phylum, the Olpidiomycota.

== Morphology ==
Representation of a chytrid zoospore: 1. Lipid vesicle; 2. Vesicles; 3. Mitochondrion, creates ATP (energy) for the cell; 4. Endoplasmic reticulum, the transport network for molecules going to specific parts of the cell; 5. Dense granule layer (ribosomes); 6. Nucleus; 7. Spongy layer (vesicles); 8. Rumposome; 9. Microbody; 10. Microtubular cone; 11. Non-flagellar basal body (procentriole); 12. Flagellar bases body (centriole); 13. Golgi body, modifies proteins and sends them out of the cell; 14. Flagellum

== Life cycle ==
Chytridiomycota are unusual among the Fungi in that they reproduce with zoospores. For most members of Chytridiomycota, sexual reproduction is not known. Asexual reproduction occurs through the release of zoospores (presumably) derived through mitosis.

Where it has been described, the sexual reproduction of chytrids occurs via a variety of methods. It is generally accepted that the resulting zygote forms a resting spore, which functions as a means of surviving adverse conditions. In some members, sexual reproduction is achieved through the fusion of isogametes (gametes of the same size and shape). This group includes the notable plant pathogens Synchytrium. Some algal parasites practice oogamy: A motile male gamete attaches itself to a nonmotile structure containing the female gamete. In another group, two thalli produce tubes that fuse and allow the gametes to meet and fuse. In the last group, rhizoids of compatible strains meet and fuse. Both nuclei migrate out of the zoosporangium and into the conjoined rhizoids, where they fuse. The resulting zygote germinates into a resting spore.

Sexual reproduction is common and well-known among members of the Monoblepharidomycetes. Typically, these chytrids practice a version of oogamy: The male is motile, and the female is stationary. This is the first occurrence of oogamy in the kingdom Fungi. Briefly, the monoblephs form oogonia, which give rise to eggs, and antheridia, which give rise to male gametes. Once fertilized, the zygote becomes an encysted or motile oospore, which ultimately becomes a resting spore that will later germinate and give rise to new zoosporangia.

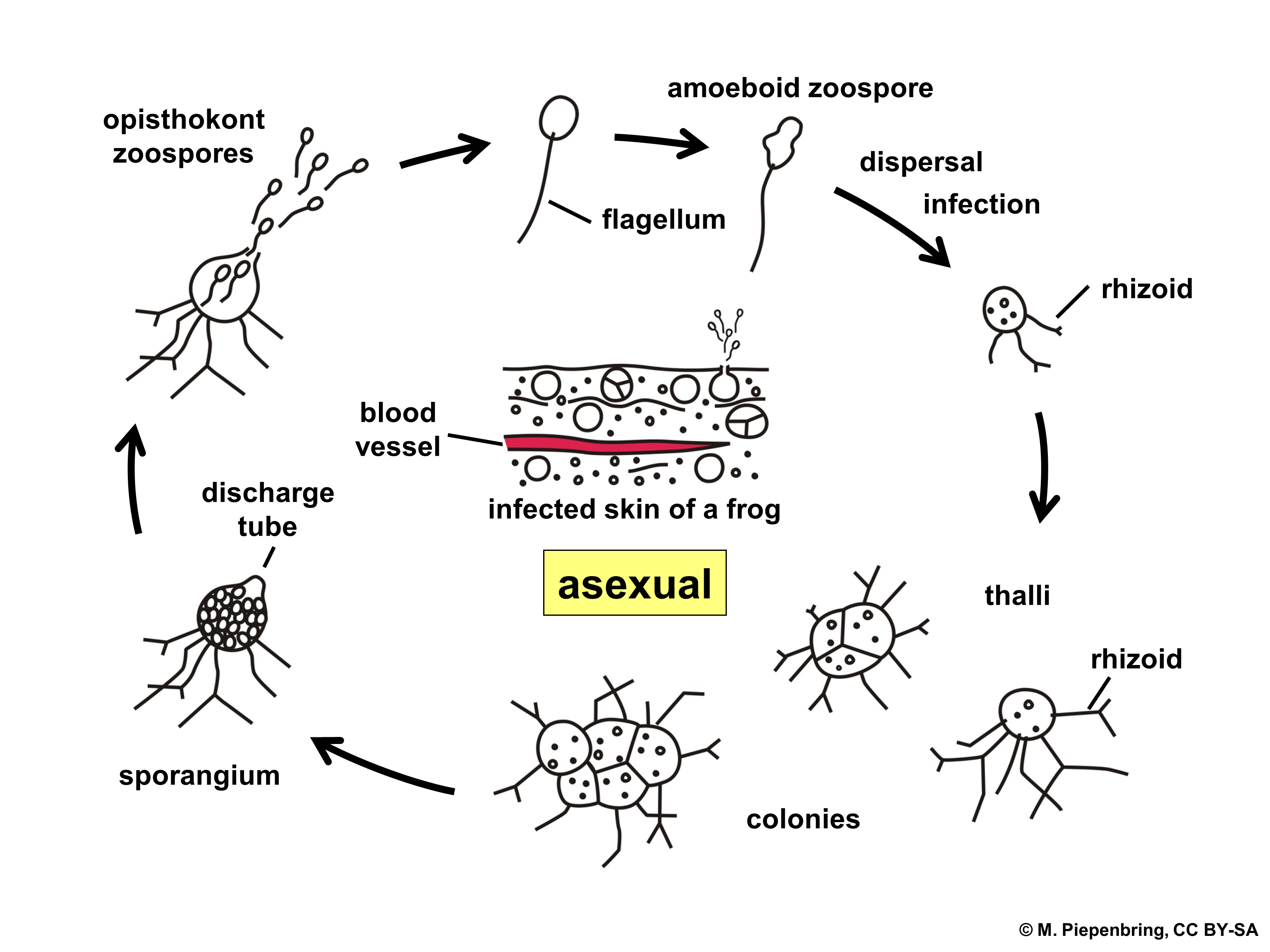
Life cycle of Batrachochytrium dendrobatidis

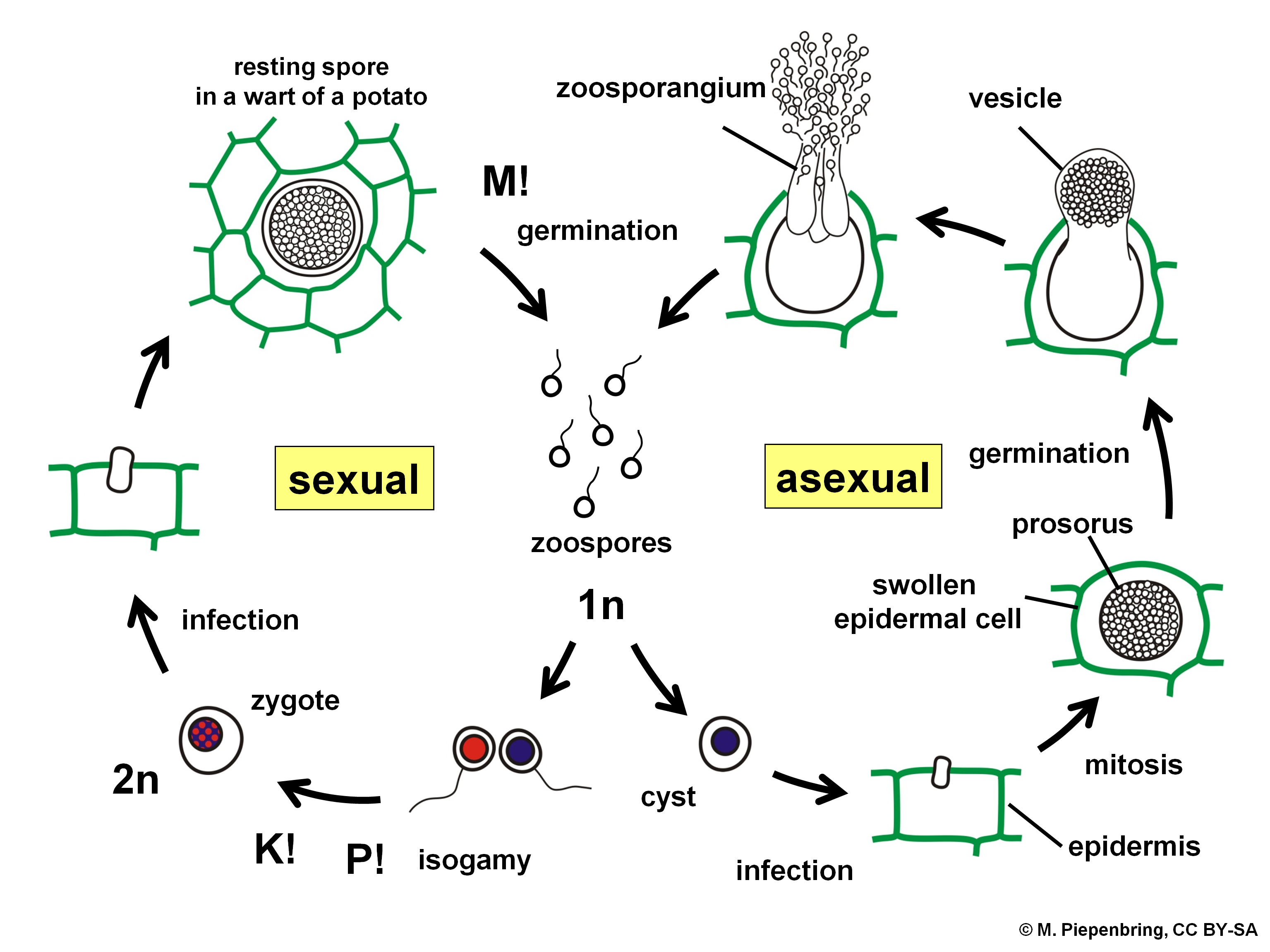
Life cycle of Synchytrium endobioticum in potato

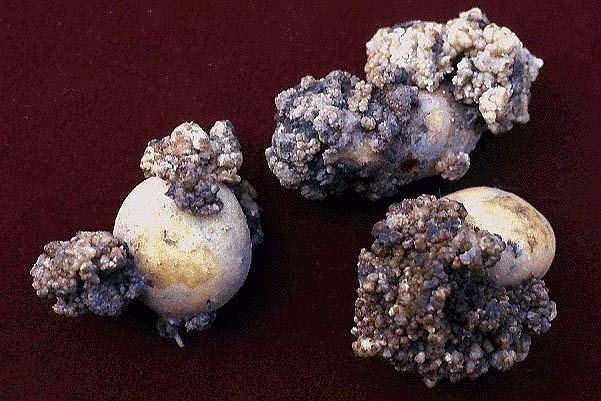
Synchytrium endobioticum on potatoes.

Upon release from the germinated resting spore, zoospores seek out a suitable substrate for growth using chemotaxis or phototaxis. Some species encyst and germinate directly upon the substrate; others encyst and germinate a short distance away. Once germinated, enzymes released from the zoospore begin to break down the substrate and utilize it to produce a new thallus. Thalli are coenocytic and usually form no true mycelium (having rhizoids instead).

Chytrids have several different growth patterns. Some are holocarpic, which means they only produce a zoosporangium and zoospores. Others are eucarpic, meaning they produce other structures, such as rhizoids, in addition to the zoosporangium and zoospores. Some chytrids are monocentric, meaning a single zoospore gives rise to a single zoosporangium. Others are polycentric, meaning one zoospore gives rise to many zoosporangia connected by a rhizomycelium. Rhizoids do not have nuclei, while a rhizomycelium can.

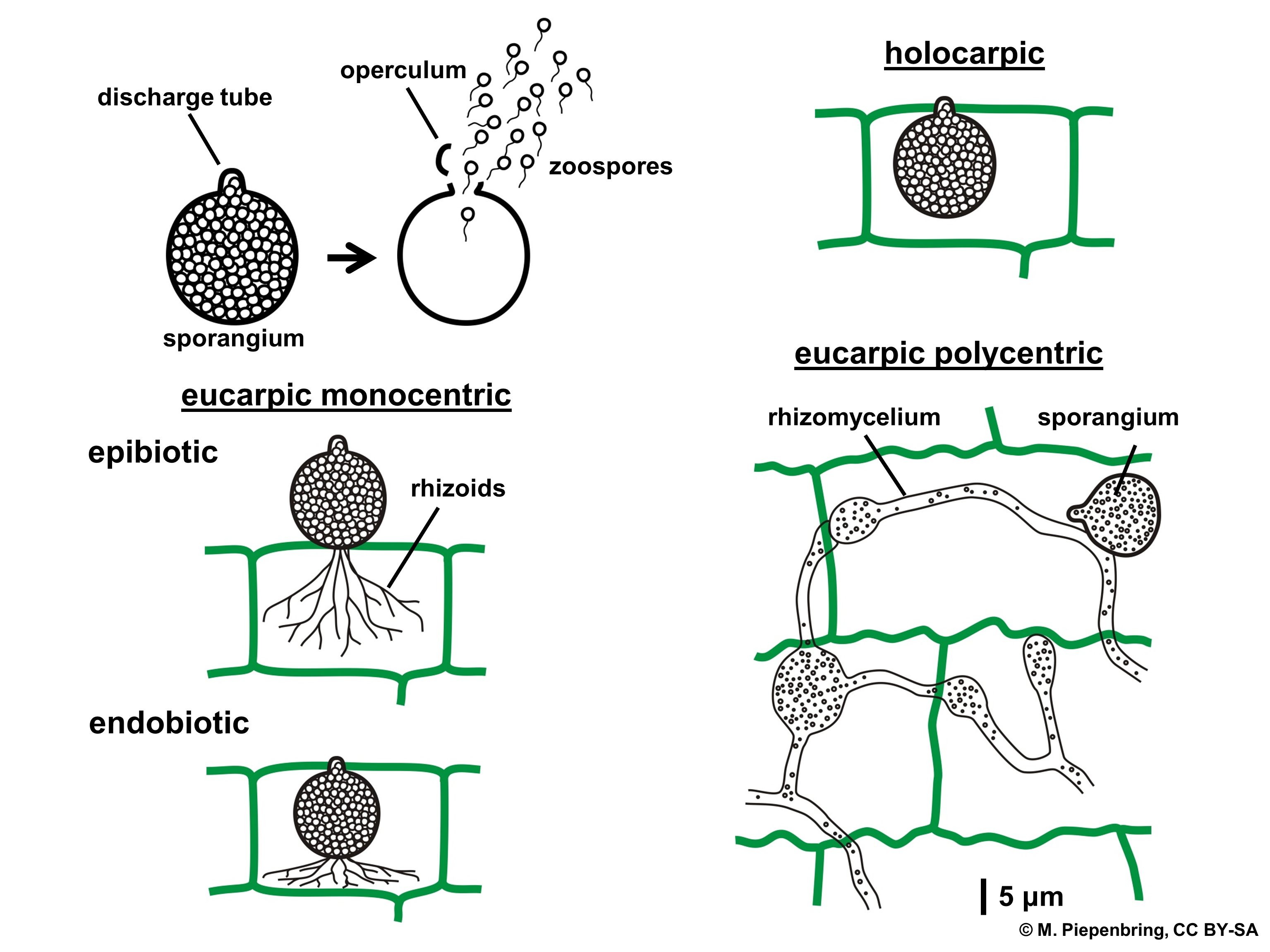
Types of chytrid thalli

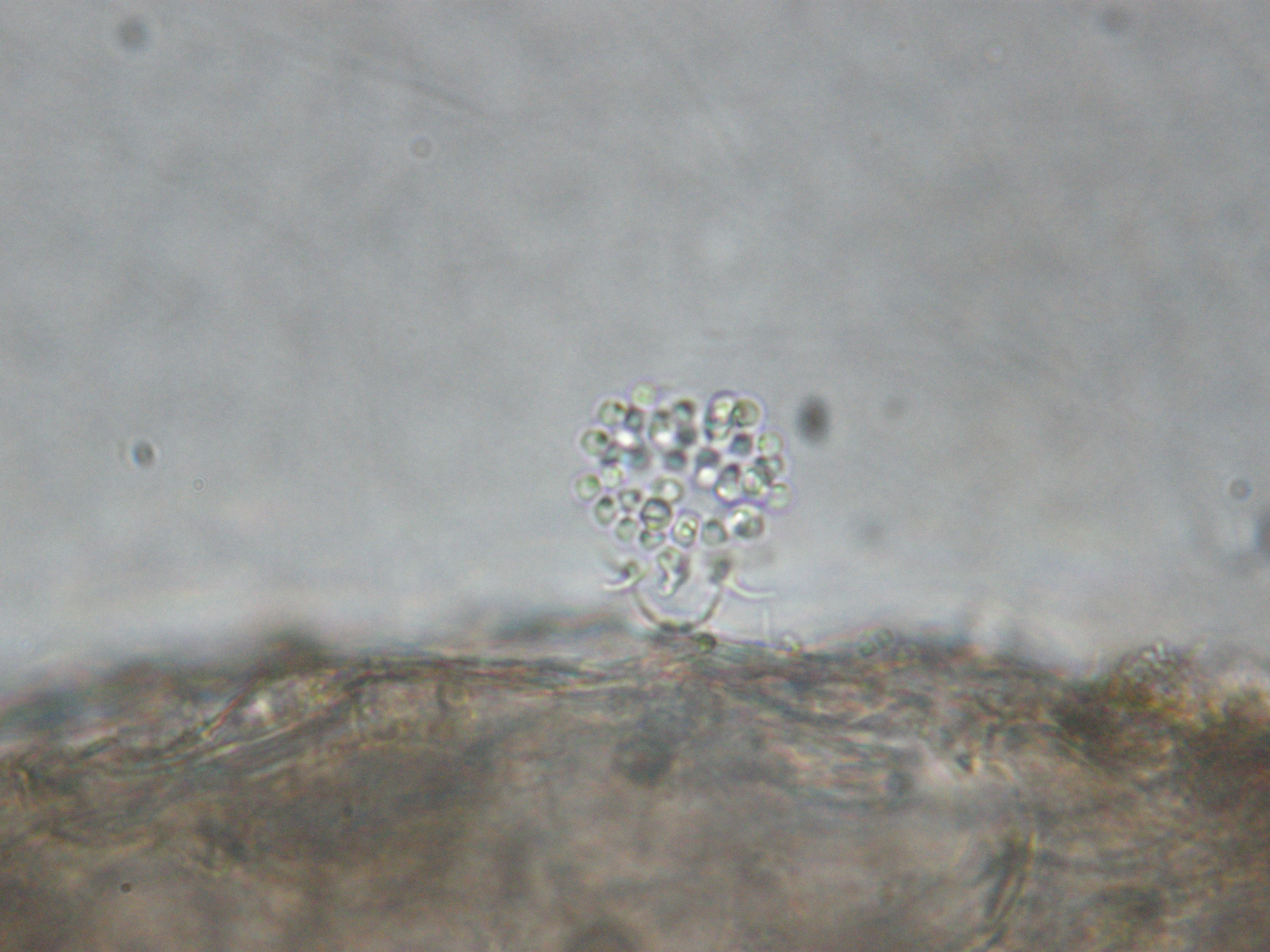
Zoospore discharge from Phylctochytrium sp.

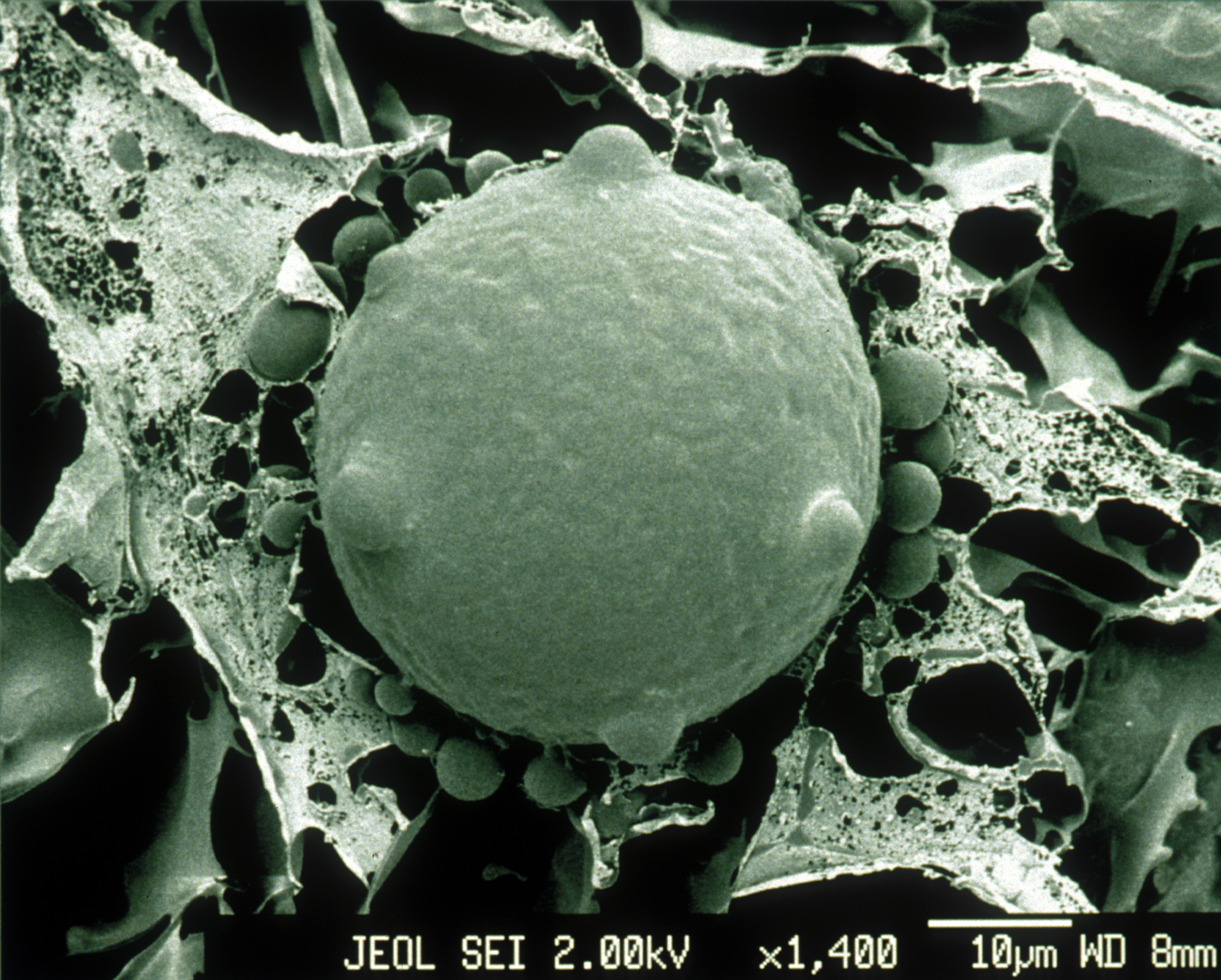
Sporangium and zoospores of the chytrid fungus B. dendrobatidis, under a scanning electron microscope

Chytrid sporangium and zoospores under the microscope

Growth continues until a new batch of zoospores is ready for release. Chytrids have a diverse set of release mechanisms that can be grouped into the broad categories of operculate or inoperculate. Operculate discharge involves the complete or incomplete detachment of a lid-like structure, called an operculum, allowing the zoospores out of the sporangium. Inoperculate chytrids release their zoospores through pores, slits, or papillae.

== Habitats ==
Chytrids are aquatic fungi, though those that thrive in the capillary network around soil particles are typically considered terrestrial. The zoospore is primarily a means of thoroughly exploring a small volume of water for a suitable substrate rather than a means of long-range dispersal.

Chytrids have been isolated from a variety of aquatic habitats, including peats, bogs, rivers, ponds, springs, and ditches, and terrestrial habitats, such as acidic soils, alkaline soils, temperate forest soils, rainforest soils, and Arctic and Antarctic soils. This has led to the belief that many chytrid species are ubiquitous and cosmopolitan. However, recent taxonomic work has demonstrated that this ubiquitous and cosmopolitan morphospecies hides cryptic diversity at the genetic and ultrastructural levels. It was first thought aquatic chytrids (and other zoosporic fungi) were primarily active in fall, winter, and spring. However, recent molecular inventories of lakes during the summer indicate that chytrids are an active, diverse part of the eukaryotic microbial community.

One of the least expected terrestrial environments the chytrid thrive in is periglacial soils. The population of the Chytridiomycota species can be supported even though there is a lack of plant life in these frozen regions due to the large amounts of water in periglacial soil and pollen blowing up from below the timberline.

== Ecological functions ==
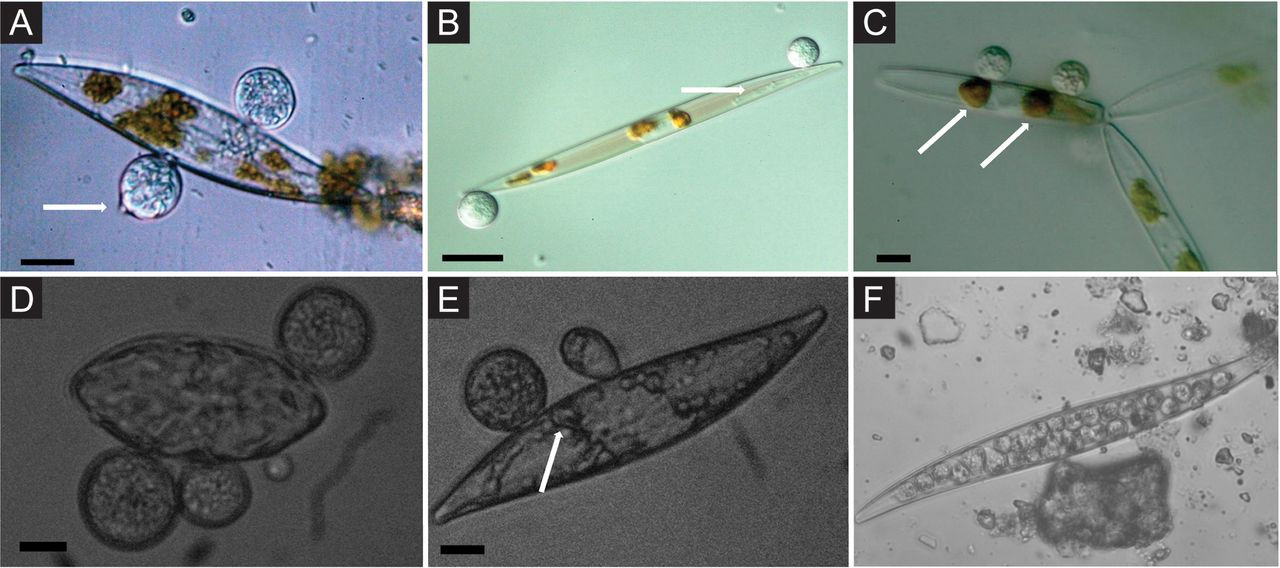
Chytrid parasites of marine diatoms. (A) Chytrid sporangia on Pleurosigma sp. The white arrow indicates the operculate discharge pore. (B) Rhizoids (white arrow) extending into the diatom host. (C) Chlorophyll aggregates localized to infection sites (white arrows). (D) & (E) Single hosts bearing multiple zoosporangia at different stages of development. The white arrow in panel (E) highlights branching rhizoids. (F) Endobiotic chytrid-like sporangia within diatom frustule; bars = 10 μm .

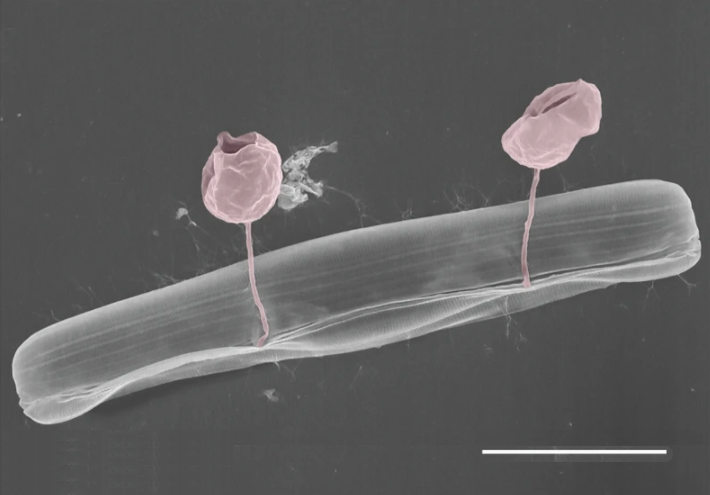
Pennate diatom from an Arctic meltpond, infected with two chytrid-like [zoo-]sporangium fungal pathogens (in false-colour red).

=== Batrachochytrium dendrobatidis ===
The chytrid Batrachochytrium dendrobatidis is responsible for chytridiomycosis, a disease of amphibians. Discovered in 1998 in Australia and Panama, this disease is known to kill amphibians in large numbers and has been suggested as a principal cause for the worldwide amphibian decline. Outbreaks of the fungus were found responsible for killing much of the Kihansi spray toad population in its native habitat of Tanzania, as well as the extinction of the golden toad in 1989. Chytridiomycosis has also been implicated in the presumed extinction of the southern gastric brooding frog, last seen in the wild in 1981, and the northern gastric brooding frog, last recorded in the wild in March 1985. The process leading to frog mortality is thought to be the loss of essential ions through pores made in the epidermal cells by the chytrid during its replication.

Recent research has revealed that elevating salt levels slightly may be able to cure chytridiomycosis in some Australian frog species, although further experimentation is needed.

=== Other parasites ===
Chytrids mainly infect algae and other eukaryotic and prokaryotic microbes. The infection can be so severe as to control primary production within the lake. It has been suggested that parasitic chytrids have a large effect on lake and pond food webs. Chytrids may also infect plant species; in particular, Synchytrium endobioticum is an important potato pathogen.

=== Saprobes ===
Arguably, the most important ecological function chytrids perform is decomposition. These ubiquitous and cosmopolitan organisms are responsible for the decomposition of refractory materials, such as pollen, cellulose, chitin, and keratin. Some chytrids live and grow on pollen by attaching threadlike structures, called rhizoids, onto the pollen grains. This mostly occurs during asexual reproduction because the zoospores that become attached to the pollen continuously reproduce and form new chytrids that will attach to other pollen grains for nutrients. This colonization of pollen happens during the springtime when bodies of water accumulate pollen falling from trees and plants.

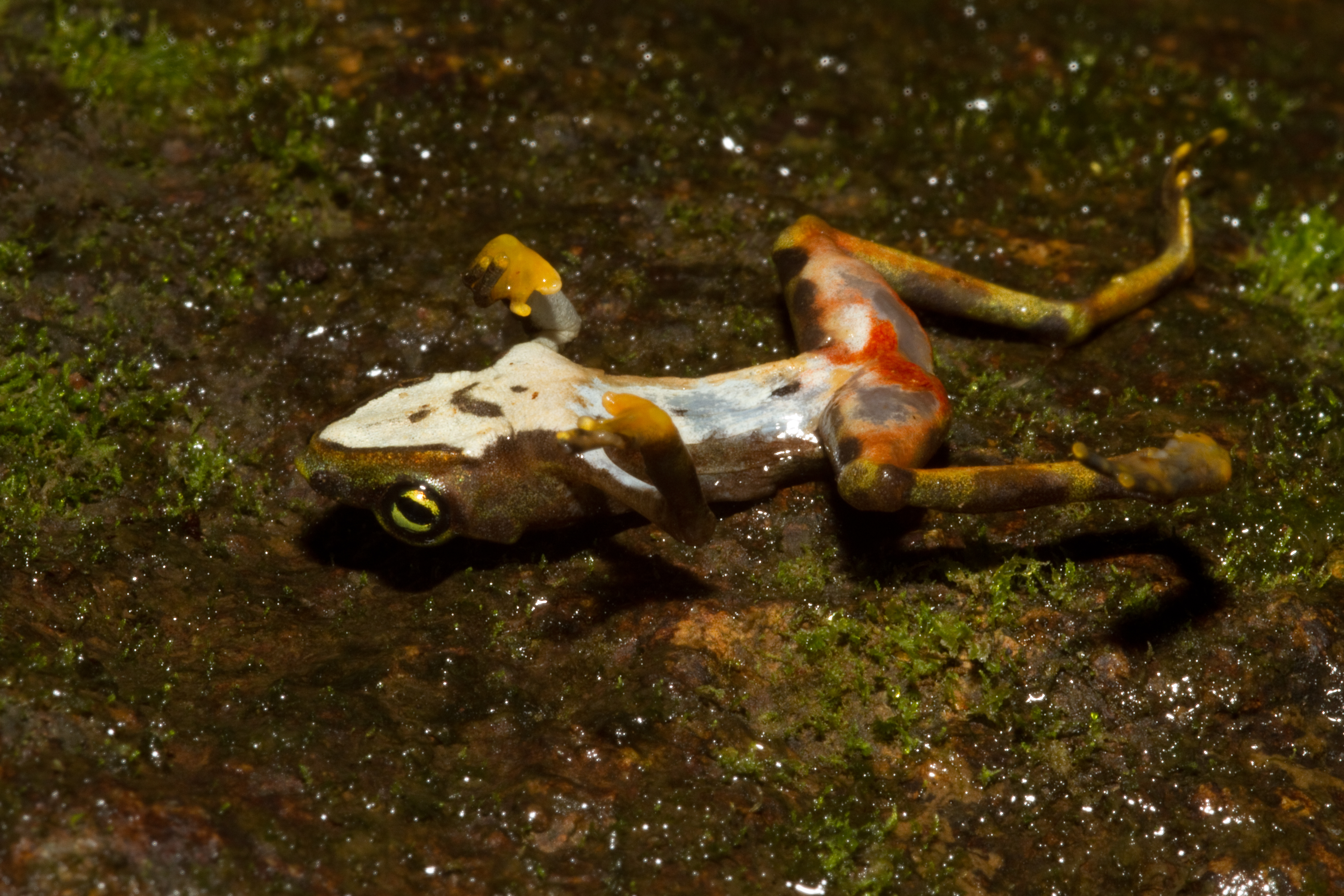
Dead frog with chytridiomycosis (B. dendrobatidis) signs

== Fossil record ==
The earliest fossils of chytrids are from the Scottish Rhynie chert, a Devonian-age lagerstätte with anatomical preservation of plants and fungi. Among the microfossils are chytrids preserved as parasites on rhyniophytes. These fossils closely resemble the modern genus Allomyces. Holocarpic chytrid remains were found in cherts from Combres in central France that date back to the late Visean. These remains were found along with eucarpic remains and are ambiguous, although they are thought to be of chytrids. Other chytrid-like fossils were found in cherts from the upper Pennsylvanian in the Saint-Etienne Basin in France, dating between 300~350 ma.

== In fictional media ==
The novel Tom Clancy's Splinter Cell: Fallout (2007) features a species of chytrid that feeds on petroleum and oil-based products. In the story, the species is modified using nuclear radiation to increase the rate at which it feeds on oil. It is then used by Islamic extremists in an attempt to destroy the world's oil supplies, thereby taking away the technological advantage of the United States.
