= Allomyces arbusculus =

Scientific classification
- Kingdom: Fungi
- Division: Blastocladiomycota
- Class: Blastocladiomycetes
- Order: Blastocladiales
- Family: Blastocladiaceae
- Genus: Allomyces
- Species: A. arbusculus

Binomial name
- Allomyces arbusculus E.J.Butler (1911)

Synonyms
- Allomyces kniepii Sörgel (1937)

Species of fungus

Allomyces arbusculus is a species of fungus from India. In biochemistry studies, it has been used as a model organism.
