= Allomyces macrogynus =

Scientific classification
- Kingdom: Fungi
- Division: Blastocladiomycota
- Class: Blastocladiomycetes
- Order: Blastocladiales
- Family: Blastocladiaceae
- Genus: Allomyces
- Species: A. macrogynus

Binomial name
- Allomyces macrogynus (R.Emers.) R.Emers. & C.M.Wilson (1954)

Synonyms
- Allomyces javanicus var. macrogynus R.Emers. (1941)

Species of fungus

Allomyces macrogynus is a species of fungus in the family Blastocladiaceae. It was first described by mycologist Ralph Emerson in 1941 as a variety of Allomyces javanicus, and later given distinct species status in 1954. Its genome has been sequenced by the Broad Institute.

== Genome studies ==
The genome of Allomyces macrogynus has been sequenced and this makes it desirable to review an organism of interesting structure and one which is responsive to environmental changes in easily observable ways. In Seattle 1969, at an informal meeting of Emerson, Machlis, Olson, Seale and Youatt, Youatt agreed to study chemical aspects of the fungus so that when the genome was known gene activity could be related to what the genes governed.

=== Normal growth ===
Allomyces macrogynus features defined by Emerson and Emerson and Wilson were of immediate interest for research and teaching because the organism had such clear and interesting structures. The vegetative growth showed the formation of rhizoids, hyphae and branching and then in the diploid cultures two kinds of fruiting body, zoosporangia ZS that reproduced the diploid organisms and resting or resistant sporangia RS that led to the haploid organism. Then on the haploid hyphae gametangia were produced with small terminal male gametangia containing carotene and larger female gametangia below.

Olson reviewed studies to 1984 that included chemotaxis of male gametes to female gametes, the identification of the hormone sirenin, studies of the chemistry of walls and discharge plugs and methods for classroom demonstrations. His comprehensive monograph also compares Allomyces with other fungi in detail.

The organism which lives in tropical ditchwater has a range of survival mechanisms which can be studied in the laboratory. These include chemotaxis of zoospores to amino acids, especially leucine and lysine and to some peptides and to oxygen, and a minicycle where a germinated spore, deprived of nutrients, can produce another zoospore to move on to better conditions. Allomyces macrogynus also shows chemotropism in the growing hyphal organisms by which the rhizoids can grow towards amino acid sources and the hyphae to a better oxygen supply. The diploid organisms can produce zoosporangia ZS when conditions are good and the resistant or resting sporangia RS when they are unfavourable. The RS can survive desiccation for years.

=== Methodology ===
Study requires synchronous culture in defined media. Allomyces macrogynus is commonly grown in media with casein hydrolysate and yeast extracts as the source of nitrogen and growth factors but can be grown in a variety of chemically defined media. The simplest of these had ammonium salt as the only source of nitrogen. Defined media allow selection of ZS or RS in diploid plants and male or female gametangia in haploid plants, the chief factor being the ratio of amino acids to glucose.

Interpretation of results is always easier if organisms are grown in chemically defined media and media could be very simple as would be expected for a saprophytic organism first isolated from ditch water. In this context it is worth noting that, although methionine is supplied in all culture media, the organisms can synthesise methionine and in their natural environment they probably use sulfide available at low concentration. Methionine is required for branching and, if added just before branching of a growing culture, hydrogen sulfide, cysteine and homocysteine can all be used.

Methods based on vortex mixing and osmotic shock cause death of many spores. Casein hydrolysate CH or mixtures of leucine and lysine can also be used. Small peptides in hydrolysed CH were also effective.

Casein hydrolysate CH was good for producing synchronous germination. Zoospores encysted and attached to the unshaken glass vessel and the CH could then be removed and replaced with defined medium. As wall development began the organisms detached from glass and with suitable shaking grew as suspensions of single organisms, ideal for observation. With new ways to produce RS synchronous cultures of haploid organisms could now be grown in the same way from selectively produced mature RS. For chemically defined induction of germination mixtures of leucine and lysine or phenylpyruvate were the best of many compounds tested.

=== Growth and cell cycles ===
The synchronously growing hyphae showed development at the hyphal tip in G1 of the growth cycle and widening at the base in G2. This study used time lapse photography because the alternating pattern seemed unusual. However, from the earliest descriptions of spore germination the same pattern was present. After rhizoids had emerged the cysts developed first at a 180° angle to the rhizoids but then widened at the base to give the typical tubular hyphae.

==== Oxygen ====
Variations in the angle of emergence of hyphae were related to oxygen gradients. A further departure from apical growth was observed if hyphal organisms, growing on the surface of solid media, were covered with a microscope slide to create an oxygen gradient. The hyphal response involved growth towards the oxygen of thin unbranched hyphae which, when they reached open access to the air, widened back to the hyphal base to give hyphae of normal diameter.

==== Ion currents and hyphal growth ====
Synchronous germination and the chemotropism for oxygen were used to orient growing organisms suitably for measurements with a delicate vibrating probe electrode to measure currents along the hyphae during the backward and forward growth and also to identify the ions involved. The latter study also showed effects of growth in applied voltages and chemotropism of the rhizoids to casein hydrolysate. The ions leaving the hyphal tip were protons, which confirmed Turian's observations of acidification of the hyphal tips.

==== Calcium ====
In the experiments with oxygen and hyphal development there was no requirement for calcium and no inhibition by EGTA. At the time of these studies many mycologists thought that calcium played a role in fungal morphology and were disinclined to believe that the labelling of agents such as the chelator EGTA and the ionophore A23187 could have been incorrectly said to be specific for calcium in many studies. Indeed, it is still not clear how the error occurred because stability constants for EGTA chelated with Fe, Zn and Mn had been published before any claim of specificity for Ca. Calculations of the availability of free ions of essential divalent cations like Fe and Zn showed that experiments with EGTA were better explained as having caused deficiencies in these essential ions. Classical demonstration of the requirements for trace metals requires careful cleaning of all glassware or plastic dishes and the use of very pure distilled water, and AR grade chemicals. By this method A.macrogynus and Achlya species were shown to require Fe, and Zn but not Ca. The traditional supply of calcium salts to fungal cultures may have met the need for trace elements as even A.R. calcium salts always contain other divalent cations.
