= Allomyces catenoides =

Scientific classification
- Domain: Eukaryota
- Kingdom: Fungi
- Division: Blastocladiomycota
- Class: Blastocladiomycetes
- Order: Blastocladiales
- Family: Blastocladiaceae
- Genus: Allomyces
- Species: A. catenoides

Binomial name
- Allomyces catenoides Sparrow, 1964

Species of fungus

Allomyces catenoides is a species of fungus in the family Blastocladiaceae. It was described by Frederick Kroeber Sparrow in 1964.
