= Allomyces cystogenus =

Scientific classification
- Domain: Eukaryota
- Kingdom: Fungi
- Division: Blastocladiomycota
- Class: Blastocladiomycetes
- Order: Blastocladiales
- Family: Blastocladiaceae
- Genus: Allomyces
- Species: A. cystogenus

Binomial name
- Allomyces cystogenus R.Emers. (1941)

Species of fungus

Allomyces cystogenus is a species of fungus in the family Blastocladiaceae. It was described as new to science in 1941 by Ralph Emerson.
