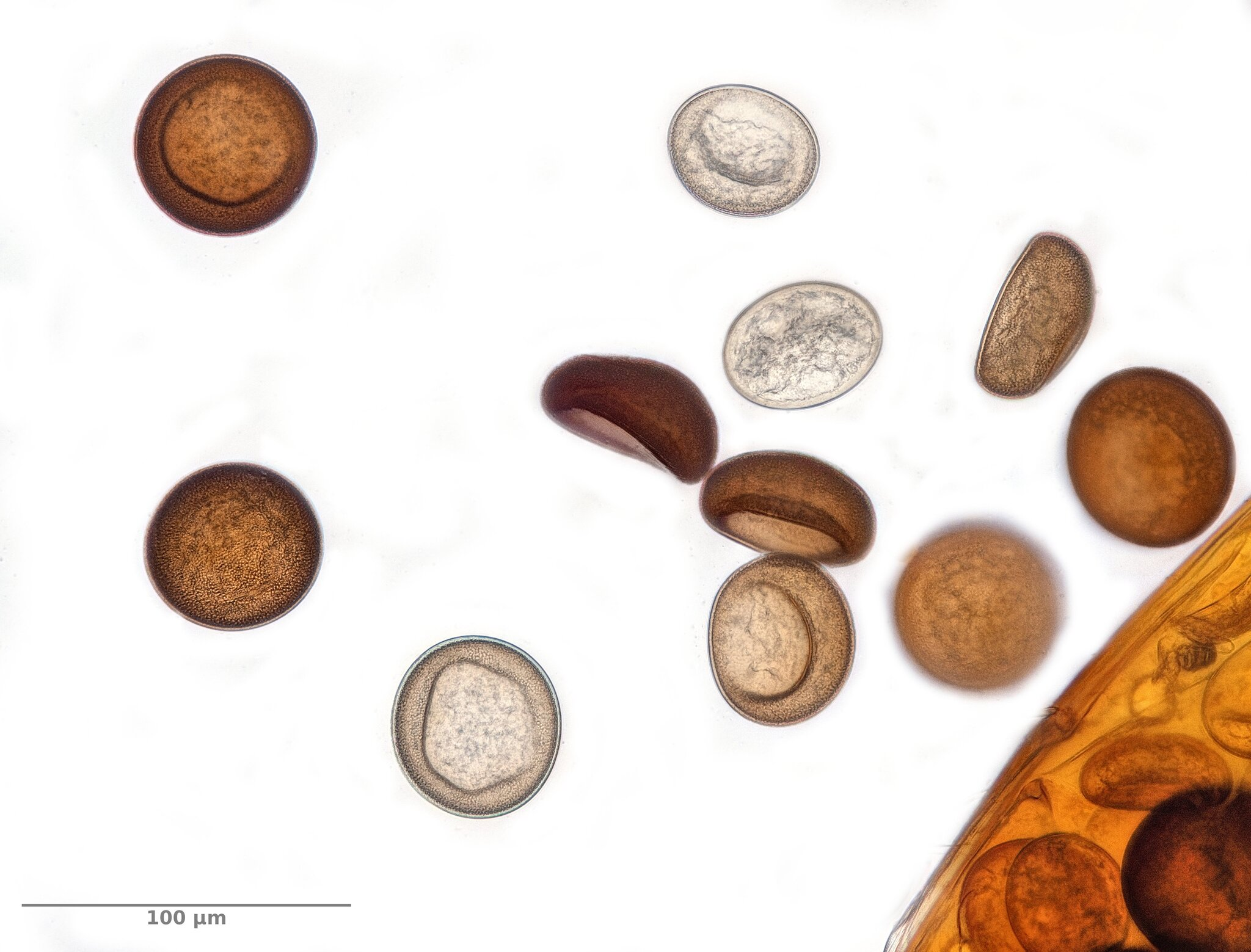
- Temnothorax albipennis infected with Myrmicinosporidium durum, Dinant, BE, 14 April 2025 (Gilles San Martin)

Scientific classification
- Kingdom: Fungi
- Division: Blastocladiomycota
- Class: Blastocladiomycetes
- Order: Blastocladiales
- Genus: Myrmicinosporidium
- Species: M. durum

Binomial name
- Myrmicinosporidium durum Hölldobler, 1933

= Myrmicinosporidium durum =

Species of entomopathic fungus

Myrmicinosporidium durum is an entomopathogenic fungus in the phylum Blastocladiomycota. It infects many ant species and is distributed almost globally.

== Taxonomic history ==
Karl Hölldobler described Myrmicinosporidium durum from infected ants of the species Leptothorax tuberum in Wurzburg, Germany.

Subsequent research confirmed the fungal nature of the infection and suggested a relationship with Coelomomyces in the Chytridiomycetes.

In 2021, Gorczak and Trigos-Peral demonstrated using rDNA markers from infected Solenopsis fugax workers that M. durum belongs to Blastocladiomycota.

== Morphology ==
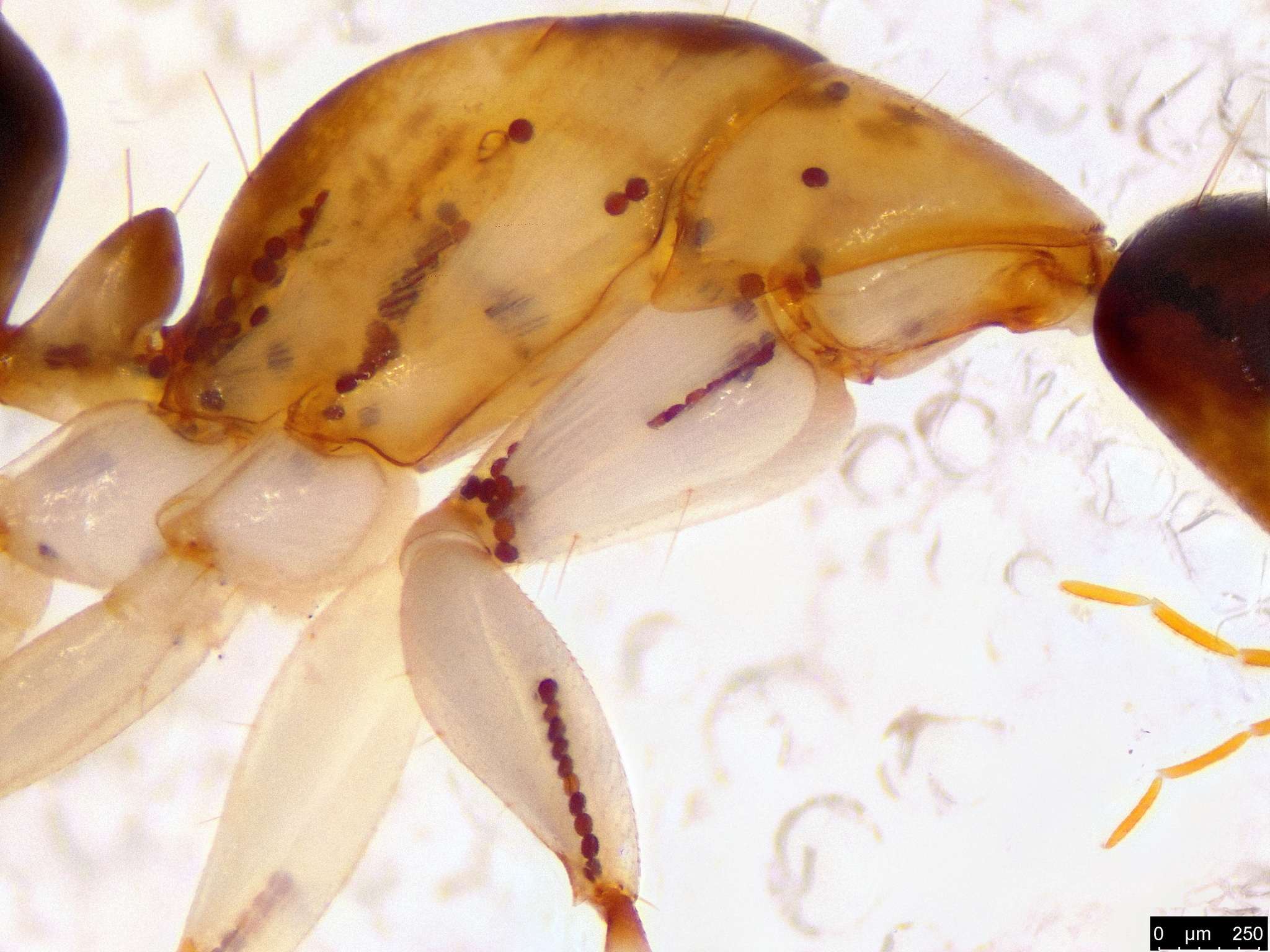
Myrmicinosporidium durum infection with spores throughout hemocoel of Camponotus claripes ant collected in Malaise trap, 15-22 January 2021, Aranda, ACT, Australia

Myrmicinosporidium durum is normally detected because of its dark thick-walled spores that develop in large numbers inside the insect's hemocoel and that can be seen through the cuticle. Hyphae and mycelium were not seen before 1993.

== Distribution ==
Myrmicinosporidium durum has been recorded from many European countries, North America and Australia.
