= Blastocladia arborata =

Scientific classification
- Kingdom: Fungi
- Division: Blastocladiomycota
- Class: Blastocladiomycetes
- Order: Blastocladiales
- Family: Blastocladiaceae
- Genus: Blastocladia
- Species: B. arborata

Binomial name
- Blastocladia arborata Dasgupta & John, 1988

Species of fungus

Blastocladia arborata is a species of fungus found in India.
