= Physoderma trifolii =

Scientific classification
- Kingdom: Fungi
- Division: Blastocladiomycota
- Class: Physodermatomycetes
- Order: Physodermatales
- Family: Physodermataceae
- Genus: Physoderma
- Species: P. trifolii

Binomial name
- Physoderma trifolii (Pass.) Karling, (1950)

Synonyms
- Urophlyctis trifolii

Species of fungus

Physoderma trifolii is a plant pathogen infecting red clover.
