= Blastocladia caduca =

Scientific classification
- Domain: Eukaryota
- Kingdom: Fungi
- Division: Blastocladiomycota
- Class: Blastocladiomycetes
- Order: Blastocladiales
- Family: Blastocladiaceae
- Genus: Blastocladia
- Species: B. caduca

Binomial name
- Blastocladia caduca Das-Gupta and John, 1988

Species of fungus

Blastocladia caduca is a species of fungus from India.
