= Allomyces neomoniliformis =

Scientific classification
- Domain: Eukaryota
- Kingdom: Fungi
- Division: Blastocladiomycota
- Class: Blastocladiomycetes
- Order: Blastocladiales
- Family: Blastocladiaceae
- Genus: Allomyces
- Species: A. neomoniliformis

Binomial name
- Allomyces neomoniliformis Indoh (1940)

Synonyms
- Allomyces cystogenus Emerson (1941)

Species of fungus

Allomyces neomoniliformis is a species of fungus from Japan.
