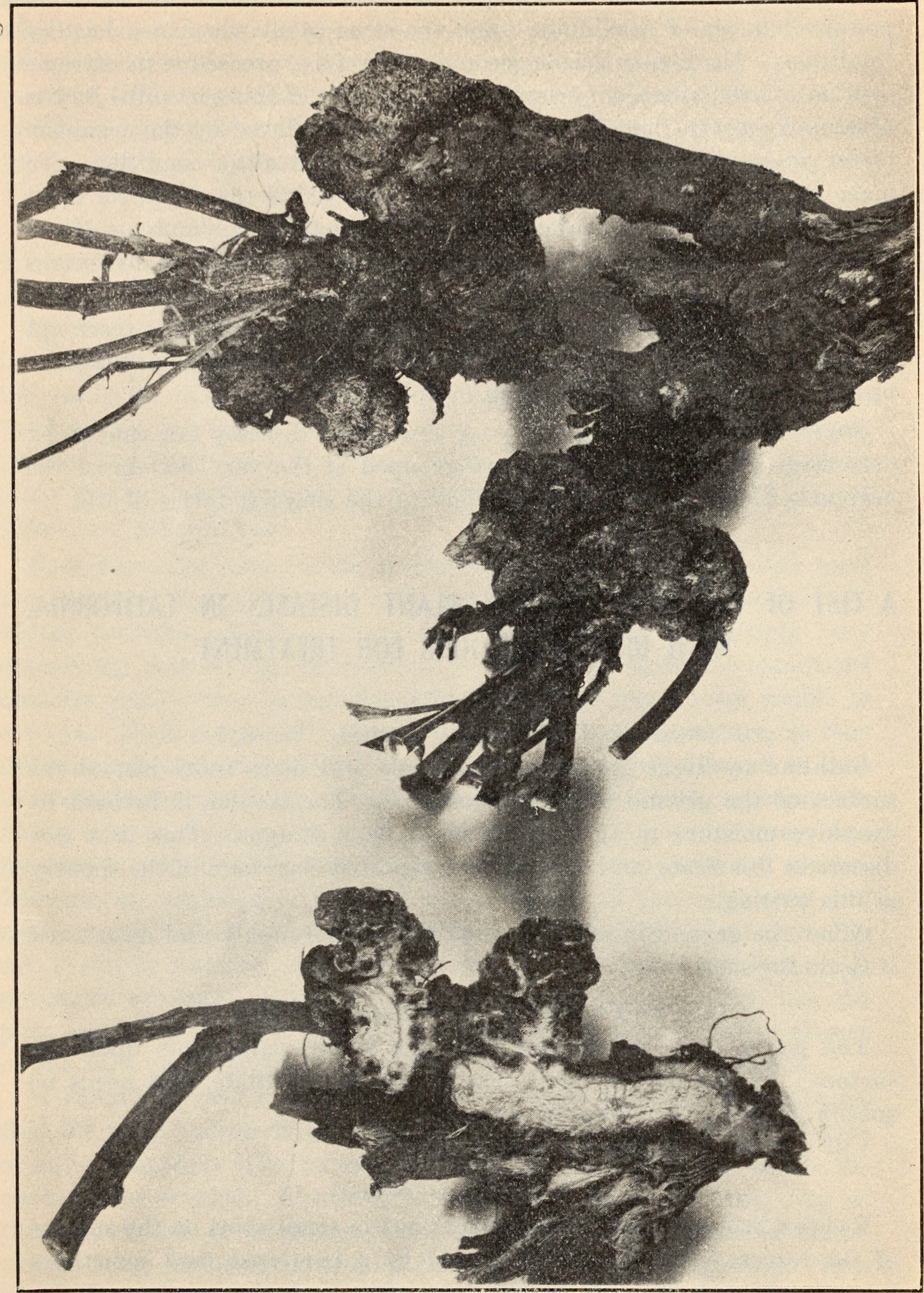

Scientific classification
- Domain: Eukaryota
- Kingdom: Fungi
- Division: Blastocladiomycota
- Class: Physodermatomycetes
- Order: Physodermatales
- Family: Physodermataceae
- Genus: Physoderma
- Species: P. alfalfae

Binomial name
- Physoderma alfalfae (Pat. & Lagerh.) Karling (1950)

Synonyms
- Cladochytrium alfalfae Lagerh. (1895); Urophlyctis alfalfae (Lagerh.) Magnus (1902)

= Physoderma alfalfae =

Species of fungus

Physoderma alfalfae is a species of fungus in the family Physodermataceae. A plant pathogen, it causes crown wart of alfalfa.
