= Blastocladia bonaerensis =

Scientific classification
- Domain: Eukaryota
- Kingdom: Fungi
- Division: Blastocladiomycota
- Class: Blastocladiomycetes
- Order: Blastocladiales
- Family: Blastocladiaceae
- Genus: Blastocladia
- Species: B. bonaerensis

Binomial name
- Blastocladia bonaerensis Steciow and Marano, 2006

Species of fungus

Blastocladia bonaerensis is a species of aquatic fungus from Argentina.
