= Coelomomyces elegans =

Scientific classification
- Kingdom: Fungi
- Division: Blastocladiomycota
- Class: Blastocladiomycetes
- Order: Blastocladiales
- Family: Coelomomycetaceae
- Genus: Coelomomyces
- Species: C. elegans

Binomial name
- Coelomomyces elegans Couch & Rajap. 1985

Species of fungus

Coelomomyces elegans is a species of mosquito parasitic fungi, in the genus Coelomomyces. It has been found in Culex gelidus mosquitoes, in Matara, Sri Lanka.

It is distinguishable from other species of Coelomomycetaceae by its resting sporangia, which are ornamented by circular depressed areas with papillae. Other distinct features include prominent vertical striae within ridges and a dehiscence split bordered by papillae.
