= Blastocladia angusta =

Scientific classification
- Domain: Eukaryota
- Kingdom: Fungi
- Division: Blastocladiomycota
- Class: Blastocladiomycetes
- Order: Blastocladiales
- Family: Blastocladiaceae
- Genus: Blastocladia
- Species: B. angusta

Binomial name
- Blastocladia angusta Lund, 1834

Species of fungus

Blastocladia angusta is a species of fungus.
