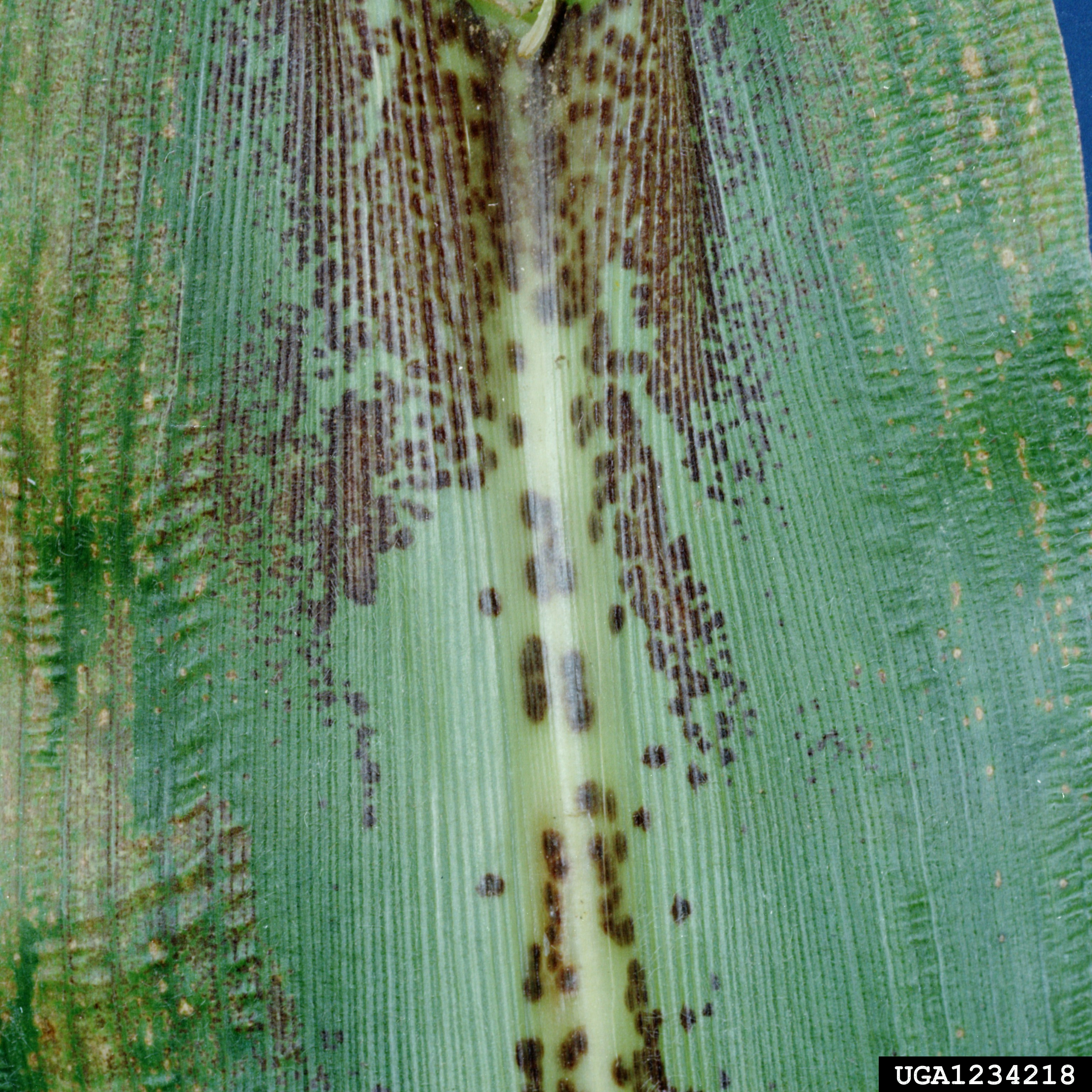
- Maize leaf showing infection by Physoderma maydis

Scientific classification
- Domain: Eukaryota
- Kingdom: Fungi
- Division: Blastocladiomycota
- Class: Physodermatomycetes
- Order: Physodermatales
- Family: Physodermataceae
- Genus: Physoderma
- Species: P. maydis

Binomial name
- Physoderma maydis (Miyabe) Miyabe, 1909

= Physoderma maydis =

Species of fungus

Physoderma maydis is a species of fungus in the family Physodermataceae. It is a pathogen of the maize, causing a disease known as brown spot of maize or brown spot of corn. This species was first labeled in 1910 in India, then again a year later in Illinois.
