= Physoderma leproides =

Scientific classification
- Domain: Eukaryota
- Kingdom: Fungi
- Division: Blastocladiomycota
- Class: Physodermatomycetes
- Order: Physodermatales
- Family: Physodermataceae
- Genus: Physoderma
- Species: P. leproides

Binomial name
- Physoderma leproides (Trab.) Lagerh. (1950)

Synonyms
- Oedomyces leproides (Trab.) Trab. (1894); Entyloma leproideum Trab. (1894); Urophlyctis leproides (Trab.) Magnus (1897)

Species of fungus

Physoderma leproides is a species of fungus in the family Physodermataceae. It is a plant pathogen that infects beets (Beta vulgaris). Common names given to the disease caused by the fungus include leaf and crown wart, marbled or beet root tumour.

== See also ==
- List of beet diseases
