= Allomyces strangulata =

Scientific classification
- Domain: Eukaryota
- Kingdom: Fungi
- Division: Blastocladiomycota
- Class: Blastocladiomycetes
- Order: Blastocladiales
- Family: Blastocladiaceae
- Genus: Allomyces
- Species: A. strangulata

Binomial name
- Allomyces strangulata Minden, 1916

Species of fungus

Allomyces strangulata is a species of fungus.
