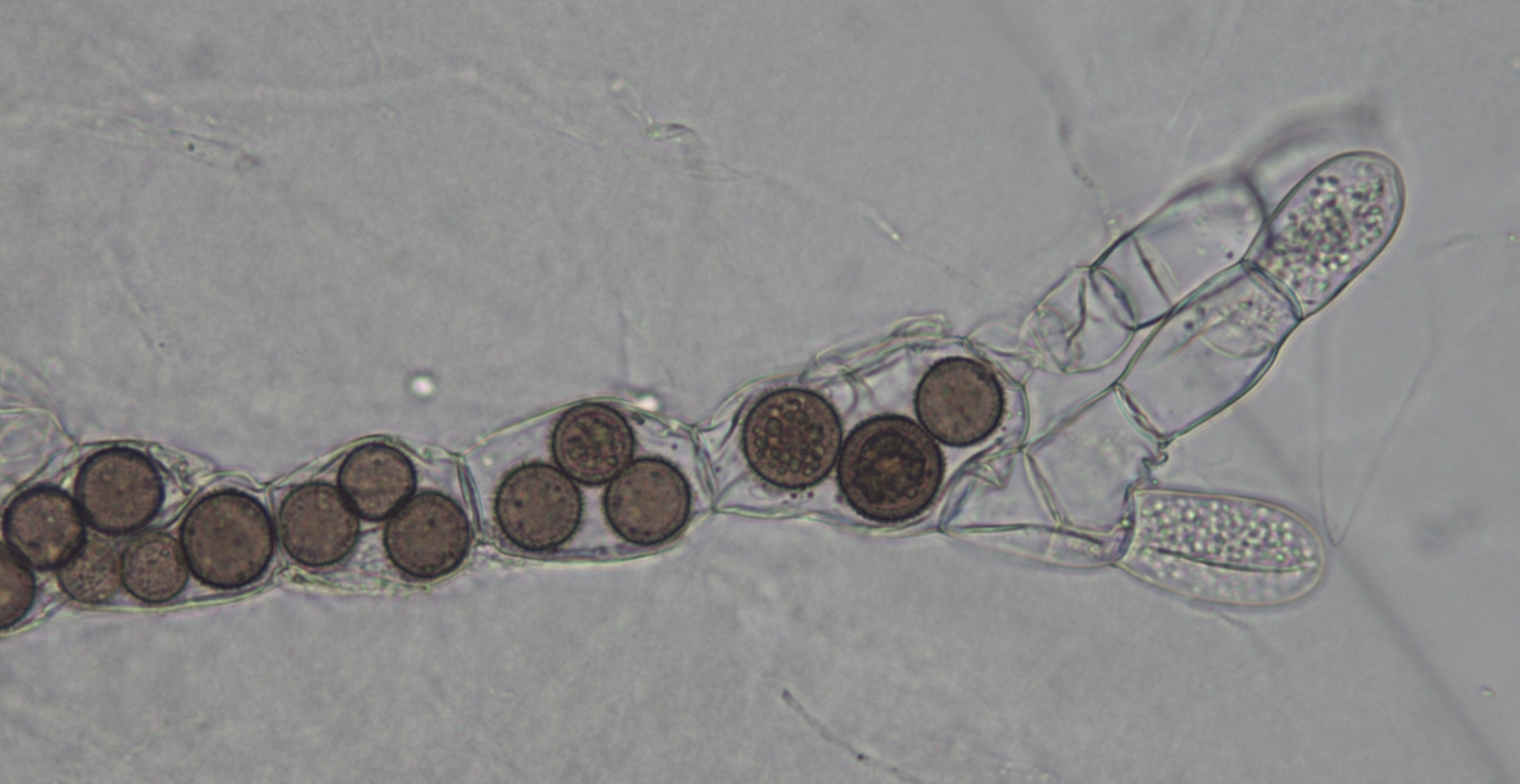
- Rozella allomycis parasitizing Allomyces

Scientific classification
- Kingdom: Fungi
- Division: Rozellomycota; James & Berbee 2011 ex Doweld 2013
- Class: Rozellomycetes; Tedersoo 2017
- Order: Rozellales; Corsaro 2022
- Family: Rozellaceae; Doweld 2013
- Genus: Rozella; Cornu 1872

Type species
- Rozella septigena Cornu 1872

Species
- See text

Synonyms
- Rozia Cornu 1872; Pleolpidium Fischer 1892; Skirgiellia Batko 1978

= Rozella =

Genus of fungi

Rozella is a fungal genus of obligate endoparasites of a variety of hosts, including Oomycota, Chytridiomycota, and Blastocladiomycota. Rozella was circumscribed by French mycologist Marie Maxime Cornu in 1872. Considered one of the earliest diverging lineages of fungi, the widespread genus contains 27 species, with the most well studied being Rozella allomycis. Rozella is a member of a large clade of fungi referred to as the Cryptomycota/Rozellomycota. While some can be maintained in dual culture with the host, most have not been cultured, but they have been detected, using molecular techniques, in soil samples, and in freshwater and marine ecosystems. Zoospores have been observed, along with cysts, and the cells of some species are attached to diatoms.

== Morphology ==
Rozella species grow inside their hosts. At first, the thallus is unwalled and indistinguishable from the host. As growth continues, the thallus will either form a zoosporangium using the wall of the host or a thick-walled resting spore that can be smooth or spiny. From its conception, there have been two divergent morphologies within the genus. Monosporangiate species form a single zoosporangium within the host. Polysporangiate species form multiple zoosporangia that are separated with septa.

== Ecology ==
Most described species are parasites of Oomycota, Chytridiomycota, and Blastocladiomycota. Rozella itersoniliae is a parasite of the basidiomycete Itersonilia perplexans, though some authors doubt its placement in the genus. Rozella coleochatis parasitizes a species of the green alga Coleochaete.

== Taxonomy ==
The genus name of Rozella is in honour of Ernest Roze (1833–1900), who was a French Administrator and high official in the Ministry of Finance of France, botanist (Bryology, Mycology and Algology).

French mycologist Marie Maxime Cornu in 1872 circumscribed the genus to accommodate four species: R. septigena, R. monoblepharidis-polymorphae, R. rhipidii-spinosi, and R. apodyae-brachynematis. Later authors shortened these to R. septigena, R. monoblepharidis, R. rhipidii, and R. apodyae. Based on the monosporangiate/polysporangiate differences in development and morphology, Fischer circumscribed Pleolpidium using R. monoblepharidis as the type and leaving R. septigena as the type species in Rozella. Clemonts and Shear also designated R. setigena as the type of Rozella in 1931. Later, R. allomycis and R. achlyae were described, and later authors treated Pleolpidium as a synonym of Rozella. Batko later circumscribed Skirgiella to accommodate the polysporangiate species and retained the monosporangiate species in Rozella. However, because this removed the type from the genus, it was nomenclaturally invalid. Additionally, molecular phylogenies consistently group monosporangiate and polysporangiate species together, thus validating the monophyly of the genus.

Traditionally, Rozella has been classified as a member of Chytridiomycota, either as a member of Chytridiales or Spizellomycetales. However, molecular phylogenies place it well outside of Chytridiomycota with a plethora of environmental sequences. There is considerable debate over the name of this larger clade: Cryptomycota, Rozellida, Rozellamycota.

== Notable species ==
=== Rozella allomycis ===
Rozella allomycis is one of the most extensively studied species; it was first described by Foust in 1937. Foust did not provide a Latin description, which invalidated the name; Doweld, in 2014, validated the name and corrected the specific epithet to allomycetis.

Rozella allomycis can parasitize multiple Allomyces species, including A. macrogynus and A. arbuscula. For A. macrogynus, it is able to parasitize both the sporophyte and the gametophyte. R. allomycis zoospores are chemotaxically attached to Allomyces. Once in contact, the zoospore encysts and germinates. The host cell wall is penetrated with an infection tube, and the contents of the zoospore are injected into the host. The infection tube causes an invagination of the host cell membrane, which then envelopes the R. allomycis protoplast. Host mitochondria are recruited to the host-parasite interface. Sometimes, host mitochondria are found within the R. allomycis protoplast within three-membrane vacuoles, which is evidence the R. allomycis protoplast is phagocytizing the host cytoplasm as it grows. As it grows, the R. allomycis protoplast completely fills a portion of the host, which is separated by a host septum. The protoplast develops into a zoosporangium and releases zoospores. As the infection progresses, R. allomycis protoplasts will instead form resting spores with thick, spiny walls.

=== Rozella polyphagi ===
Rozella polyphagi was first described in 1938 by F. K. Sparrow as a parasite of Polyphagus laevis, though it also parasitizes Polyphagus euglenae. Rozella polyphagi infects both the prosporangium and the sporangium of the host and exists as an unwalled protoplast within the host. Host mitochondria could be observed within R. polyphagi protoplast vacuoles; cytoplasmic extensions of R. polyphagi around host cytoplasm also occur. This suggests that Rozella polyphagi phagocytizes host cytoplasm.

=== Rozella rhizoclosmatii ===
A species of Rozella on Rhizoclosmatium was first reported in a molecular phylogeny simply as Rozella ex Rhizoclosmatium and was later named Rozella rhizoclosmatii. The species causes hypertrophy of infected Rhizoclosmatium and completely fills the host. In contrast to other Rozella species, infection does not take place when the host is growing. Rozella rhizoclosmatii zoospores are attracted to and infect the zoospores of Rhizoclosmatium.

== Species ==
- Rozella achlyae Shanor 1942
- Rozella allomyces Nabel 1939
- Rozella allomycis Faust 1937
- Rozella apodyae-brachynematis Cornu 1872
- Rozella barrettii Karling 1942
- Rozella blastocladiae (Minden 1911) Sparrow 1938
- Rozella canterae Sparrow 1960
- Rozella chytriomycetis Karling 1946
- Rozella cladochytrii Karling 1941
- Rozella coleochaetes Sparrow 1965
- Rozella cuculus (Butler 1907) Sparrow 1938
- Rozella diplophlyctidis Karling 1987
- Rozella endochytrii Karling 1941
- Rozella irregularis (Butler 1907) Sparrow 1938
- Rozella laevis Karling 1942
- Rozella longicollis Karling 1966
- Rozella longisporangia Willoughby & Rigg 1983
- Rozella marina (Sparrow 1936) Sparrow 1938
- Rozella monoblepharidis-polymorphae Cornu 1872
- Rozella multimorpha Letcher et al. 2017
- Rozella parva Canter 1969
- Rozella polyphagia (Sparrow 1933) Sparrow 1938
- Rozella rhipidii-spinosi Cornu 1872
- Rozella rhizoclosmatii Letcher & Longcore 2017
- Rozella rhizophlycti Karling 1942
- Rozella rhizophydii Karling 1944
- Rozella septigena Cornu 1872
