= Coelomomyces psorophorae =

Scientific classification
- Kingdom: Fungi
- Division: Blastocladiomycota
- Class: Blastocladiomycetes
- Order: Blastocladiales
- Family: Coelomomycetaceae
- Genus: Coelomomyces
- Species: C. psorophorae

Binomial name
- Coelomomyces psorophorae Couch (1962)

Synonyms
- Coelomomyces opificis Pillai & J.M.B.Sm. (1968); Coelomomyces psorophorae var. halophilus Couch & Lum (1985); Coelomomyces psorophorae var. tasmaniensis Couch & Laird (1985)

Species of parasitic fungus

Coelomomyces psorophorae is a species of aquatic fungus in the family Coelomomycetaceae. It is a parasite of mosquito larvae. Its two-host life cycle involves alternating between mosquitoes and small aquatic crustaceans (copepods), with different reproductive stages occurring in each host. The fungus essentially hijacks the mosquito's body systems, growing inside the larva and eventually producing spores that can survive harsh environmental conditions. Research on this species has provided insights into how parasitic fungi evolve specialized strategies to exploit multiple hosts in aquatic ecosystems.

== Taxonomy ==
Coelomomyces psorophorae was first proposed as a new species in 1945 by the American mycologist John Nathaniel Couch. He obtained the type from a specimen of Psorophora ciliata that was collected near Moultrie, Georgia, in 1942. However, Couch's 1945 protologue did not meet the then-current requirements of the International Code of Botanical Nomenclature: under Art. 39.1 (Melbourne Code numbering), names of new taxa had to be accompanied by a Latin description or diagnosis (or a reference to one) for valid publication. Couch described the fungus in English only. As a result the name Coelomomyces psorophorae as published in 1945 is treated as nomen invalidum. He published the name validly in 1962.

== Description ==
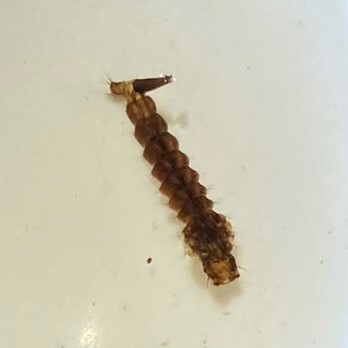
Psorophora ciliata larva

Parasitic in the larvae of the mosquito Psorophora ciliata, the fungus produces hyphae about 7.5–10 μm thick that are poorly developed; these hyphae fragment into "hyphal bodies" which disseminate through the larva and either continue the infection or mature into resting sporangia. The resting sporangia are usually oval, often slightly flattened on one side, and only rarely truly spherical. Oval sporangia measure about 37–67 × 46–100 μm; spherical ones are about 40–78 μm in diameter. Their wall is thick (about 3–10 μm) and two-layered: the inner layer is smooth, while the outer layer bears innumerable minute, interconnected pits and a longitudinal slit; both wall layers are deep brown. Germination of these resting bodies was not observed in the original material. Couch also noted that this species had the largest resting sporangia then known in Coelomomyces and a thicker wall than others in the genus—an apparent adaptation to the host's drought-prone habitats in which Psorophora eggs can persist dry for long periods before flooding.

== Cell biology ==
The motile stages, including zoospore, isogamete, and zygote, share a compact "blastocladialean" layout. Each cell carries a prominent nuclear cap backed by a basket of microtubules that partly wraps the nucleus. Close to this sits a side-body complex made up of a large mitochondrion, a microbody, and multiple lipid droplets. The single posterior flagellum inserts at the extreme rear; a length of axoneme continues inside the cytoplasm before joining the basal body. In contrast to saprophytic Blastocladiales, these parasitic stages lack a vestigial second basal body and striated rootlets, features interpreted as a parasite-type specialisation. All three motile stages contain characteristic "adhesion vesicles" in the cytoplasm.

The zygote is biflagellate and typically carries two nuclei connected by a narrow bridge, giving dumbbell-like nuclear profiles in section. Its perinuclear microtubule basket remains largely intact around the twin nuclear lobes, excluding the bridge region and areas where the nucleus presses against the mitochondrion. Other organelles, including rough endoplasmic reticulum (ER), clear vacuoles, and the adhesion vesicles, are conspicuous.

Zoospores closely resemble gametes in overall plan, including the nuclear cap, side-body complex, and flagellar apparatus, but they have one distinctive inclusion: a paracrystalline body that appears as a hexagonally packed array in cross-section and parallel rods in longitudinal view. This structure is not seen in gametes or zygotes.

When a zygote contacts a mosquito larva, it rapidly withdraws its flagella and discharges the contents of its adhesion vesicles at the point of contact (effectively gluing itself to the cuticle) followed by swift wall formation. By roughly 5 minutes a discrete cyst wall is evident; by 30 minutes the nuclear lobes are still encircled by the microtubule "cage", and by about 1 hour the nucleus has rounded up, the perinuclear microtubules have disassembled, rough ER is prominent, and numerous small vegetative-type mitochondria are present. This sequence matches a general chytrid pattern in which vesicle secretion initiates attachment and wall laying, with subsequent organelle "reversion" as the cell shifts from a motile to a sessile state.

Functionally, these structures align with the division of labor in the life cycle: zoospores are built to locate and infect the copepod host, whereas only the biflagellate zygote encysts on mosquito larvae. The parasite-type features (internal axoneme, absence of rootlets/vestigial basal body, adhesion vesicles) are possibly adaptations for rapid attachment to moving arthropod hosts.

== Life cycle ==
Coelomomyces psorophorae has an obligate two-host cycle alternating between mosquito larvae and a freshwater copepod. In mosquitoes (experimentally shown using Culiseta inornata), the infective stage is a biflagellate zygote that enters the larval haemocoel and grows as a diploid, weakly branched coenocytic thallus. After several days the thallus differentiates into thick-walled resistant sporangia that later germinate to release posteriorly uniflagellate zoospores; by comparison with other Blastocladiales, meiosis is inferred to occur at this germination stage. These zoospores infect the alternate host, Cyclops vernalis, where they develop into a haploid, wall-less thallus.

Within the copepod, the thallus produces wall-less gametangia that cleave into uniflagellate isogametes. C. psorophorae is heterothallic: only opposite mating types fuse, and fusion yields a biflagellate zygote. Gamete fusion may occur inside the copepod during the swarming period or soon after release; zygotes then infect new mosquito larvae, closing the cycle. Experimental crosses and infection assays demonstrated that gametes alone do not infect mosquitoes, whereas zygote-rich suspensions do, and that zoospores from mosquito sporangia infect only copepods, showing that alternation between hosts is required.

Under the reported rearing conditions, the minimum time to complete the cycle is about 20 days: roughly 9 days from infection to resistant sporangia in the mosquito, about 4 days for sporangial maturation, and about 7 days from copepod infection to production of gametes/zygotes. The study's infection trials traced a full passage from infected mosquito to copepod and back to mosquito using the same fungal line, arguing against additional hidden hosts in this species' biological life cycle.
