= Allomyces moniliformis =

Scientific classification
- Domain: Eukaryota
- Kingdom: Fungi
- Division: Blastocladiomycota
- Class: Blastocladiomycetes
- Order: Blastocladiales
- Family: Blastocladiaceae
- Genus: Allomyces
- Species: A. moniliformis

Binomial name
- Allomyces moniliformis Coker & Braxton (1926)

Species of fungus

Allomyces moniliformis is a species of fungus from the United States.
