= Blastocladia aspergilloides =

Scientific classification
- Domain: Eukaryota
- Kingdom: Fungi
- Division: Blastocladiomycota
- Class: Blastocladiomycetes
- Order: Blastocladiales
- Family: Blastocladiaceae
- Genus: Blastocladia
- Species: B. aspergilloides

Binomial name
- Blastocladia aspergilloides Crooks, 1937

Species of fungus

Blastocladia aspergilloides is a species of fungus in the family Blastocladiaceae.
