= Allomyces reticulatus =

Scientific classification
- Domain: Eukaryota
- Kingdom: Fungi
- Division: Blastocladiomycota
- Class: Blastocladiomycetes
- Order: Blastocladiales
- Family: Blastocladiaceae
- Genus: Allomyces
- Species: A. reticulatus

Binomial name
- Allomyces reticulatus Emerson & Robertson (1974)

Species of fungus

Allomyces reticulatus is a species of fungus from the United States.
