= Blastocladia coronata =

Scientific classification
- Domain: Eukaryota
- Kingdom: Fungi
- Division: Blastocladiomycota
- Class: Blastocladiomycetes
- Order: Blastocladiales
- Family: Blastocladiaceae
- Genus: Blastocladia
- Species: B. coronata

Binomial name
- Blastocladia coronata Das-Gupta and John, 1988

Species of fungus

Blastocladia coronata is a species of fungus from India.
