= Allomyces anomalus =

Scientific classification
- Kingdom: Fungi
- Division: Blastocladiomycota
- Class: Blastocladiomycetes
- Order: Blastocladiales
- Family: Blastocladiaceae
- Genus: Allomyces
- Species: A. anomalus

Binomial name
- Allomyces anomalus R. Emers. (1941)

Species of fungus

Allomyces anomalus is a species of fungus. A common water mold found throughout Asia and Africa, it is a host of the endoparasite Rozella allomycis.
