= D-glutaminase =

Class of enzymes

Identifiers
- EC no.: 3.5.1.35
- CAS no.: 37289-12-6

Databases
- BRENDA: enzyme data
- ExPASy: NiceZyme view
- KEGG: enzyme entry
- MetaCyc: metabolic pathway
- Rhea: reactions
- PDB structures: RCSB PDB PDBe PDBsum
- Gene Ontology: AmiGO / QuickGO
Search
- PMC: articles
- PubMed: articles
- NCBI: proteins

D-glutaminase (EC 3.5.1.35) is an enzyme that catalyzes the chemical reaction

D-glutamine
H_{2}O
NH_{3}
D-glutamic acid

The enzyme characterised from Blastocladiella emeronii and Aspergillus oryzae hydrolyses D-glutamine to D-glutamic acid and ammonia.

This enzyme is a hydrolase, one acting on carbon-nitrogen bonds other than peptide bonds, specifically in linear amides. The systematic name of this enzyme class is D-glutamine amidohydrolase.
