= Allomyces javanicus =

Scientific classification
- Domain: Eukaryota
- Kingdom: Fungi
- Division: Blastocladiomycota
- Class: Blastocladiomycetes
- Order: Blastocladiales
- Family: Blastocladiaceae
- Genus: Allomyces
- Species: A. javanicus

Binomial name
- Allomyces javanicus Kniep (1929)

Species of fungus

Allomyces javanicus is a species of fungus from Indonesia.
