= Entomopathogenic fungus =

Fungus that can act as a parasite of insects

Entomopathogenic fungi are parasitic unicellular or multicellular microorganisms belonging to the kingdom of Fungi, that can infect and seriously disable or kill insects.

Pathogenicity for insects is widely distributed in the kingdom of fungi and occur in six fungal phyla (Ascomycota, Oomyceta, Basidiomycota, Chytridiomycota, Zygomycota, and Microsporidia). It plays a vital ecological role in controlling insect populations by impacting 19 out of 30 known insect orders. Some fungal entomopathogens are opportunistic whereas some have evolved into highly specific pathogens of insects.

== Etymology ==
The term entomopathogenic comes from the combination of the Ancient Greek word ἔντομον (éntomon) and pathogenic, which itself comes from the combination of the Ancient Greek words πάθος (pathos) and γένος (génos). Ento is an affix denoting relation to insects, with patho being an affix to denote relation to disease. The affix genic indicates production of or result of.

== Mode of infection ==
Unlike many other insect pathogens (entomopathogenic viruses, nematodes, or bacteria), most entomopathogenic fungi do not require entry through ingestion or oral intake and instead directly attack the insect cuticle and penetrate the insect body through the exoskeleton. These fungi use a broad spectrum of virulence factors such as adhesins (to attach to insect cuticles), lytic enzymes (to hydrolyze insect cuticles), and secondary metabolites.

== Typical life cycle and general biology ==
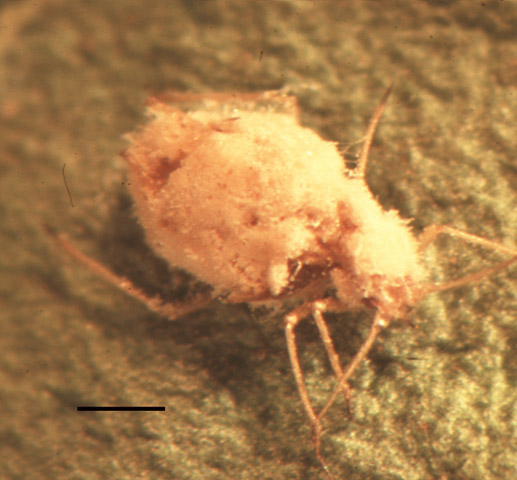
Green peach aphid, Myzus persicae, killed by the fungus Pandora neoaphidis (Entomophthoromycota: Entomophthorales) Scale bar = 0.3 mm

Entomopathogenic fungi show a diversity of lifecycles, with differences across lineages, as well as within lineages, between species, and even between isolates within species. Some fungal entomopathogens are opportunistic whereas some have evolved into highly specific pathogens of insects.

Entomopathogenic fungi all typically disperse through the environment through the use of microscopic spores (usually asexual or Conidia) that commonly use hydrophobins and adhesins to attach to and recognize the host cuticle. Germination is environmentally triggered under specific temperature and humidity conditions. Upon germination, many filamentous fungal pathogens begin growing hyphae and colonize the insect's cuticle. Some also produce structures called appressoria. These appressoria (also produced by plant pathogenic fungi) apply mechanical force onto the insect cuticle to support entry of the pathogen into the insect body.

Fungi penetrate the insect exoskeleton by boring through it using enzymatic hydrolysis. When the infection reaches the insects' body cavity (hemocoel), the fungal cells proliferate in the host body cavity, usually as walled hyphae or in the form of wall-less protoplasts (depending on the fungus involved).

Regardless of whether the infecting fungus is a host generalist or a specialist, the infection usually leads to the death of the insect, upon which the fungus emerges and sporulates on the dead insect. Sporulation usually takes place on the external surface of the cadaver. However, it can also occur on the internal surfaces of the cadaver depending on the environmental humidity. Some fungi keep the insect cadavers attached to foliage using rhizoids to ensure that they remain in the same environment where it is more likely to encounter suitable new hosts.

Entomopathogenic fungi differ in virulence. Some (usually those with a broad spectrum of hosts - host generalists) immediately kill the insect using various toxins (e.g. Metarhizium robertsii) and grow on the dead insect body, digesting it for nutrients. Others (usually fungi that have evolved host-specificity) keep the host alive longer and progress onto systematically invading and infecting host tissues (e.g. Ophiocordyceps spp.). Some host specialist entomopathogenic fungi have even evolved mechanisms of behavioral manipulation (e.g. Ophiocordyceps unilateralis - Zombie ant fungus) of their hosts. These fungi hijack the insect nervous systems using various secondary metabolites and manipulate insect behavior to move the infected insect to a place which is appropriate for the fungus to grow, sporulate and acquire new hosts.

== Diversity ==
Recent classification efforts based on genomic data resulted in major re-arrangements of the phyla in kingdom fungi: one major change included lifting the subphylum Entomophthoromycotina into a separate phylum Entomophthoromycota. Eight phyla contain Entomopathogenic fungi: Ascomycota, Basidiomycota, Chytridiomycota, Microsporidia, Oomyceta, Entomophthoromycota, Blastocladiomycota and, Kickxellomycotina. Microsporidia infect the greatest number insect orders (13) followed by Ascomycota and Entomophthoromycota (13 and 10). Fungi in Chytridiomycota and Basidiomycota infect 3 and 2 insect orders, respectively.

=== Ascomycota ===
Two of three subphyla of the phylum Ascomycota contain insect pathogens. Most ascomycetes are filamentous fungi that produce septate hyphae and have characteristics sexual phase in which they produce sexual spores called ascospores. Most entomopathogenic fungi in the Phylum Ascomycota infect and proliferate in the insect body in a parasitic phase before eventually killing the host. Upon the death of the host, these fungi have the ability to grow saprophytically in and on the insect cadaver and produce and release spores. The most characteristic group of insect pathogens in the Phylum Ascomycota is the order Hypocreales which include genera such as Ophiocordyceps, Cordyceps, and Hypocrella. Some insect pathogens in this phylum manipulate host behavior during the parasitic phase of their infection. One well studied and popular example is the insect pathogen Ophiocordyceps unilateralis, which alters the behavior of the infected insect to leave the nest and move to an area where the environment conditions better suited for the growth of the fungi. Upon the death of the host, the O. unilateralis produces a stalk-like structure erupting from the head of the dead ant from which spores are released to the peripheral environment. this process enables the fungi to infect more ants and, in the process, creates high densities of dead ants in the forest environment known as 'graveyards'.

=== Basidiomycota ===
The phylum Basidiomycota are commonly known as "superior fungi" due to their production of well-developed septate hyphae and fruiting bodies. Some basidiomycetes commonly produce visible structures such as mushrooms and puffballs. They are characterized by the asexual production of basidiospores. Fibulorhizoctonia, Uredinella, and Septobasidium are the only known genera in the phylum Basidiomycota that infect insects.

=== Chytridiomycota ===
Phylum Chytridiomycota is considered one of the earliest branching true-fungi in the fungal kingdom. They are also the only true-fungi to produce motile zoospores in their lifecycle.

Few genera of entomopathogenic fungi belong to the Phylum Chytridiomycota. The genus Nephridiophaga include unicellular endoparasites of cockroaches and genus Myiophagus include unicellular endoparasites of scale insects.

=== Blastocladiomycota ===
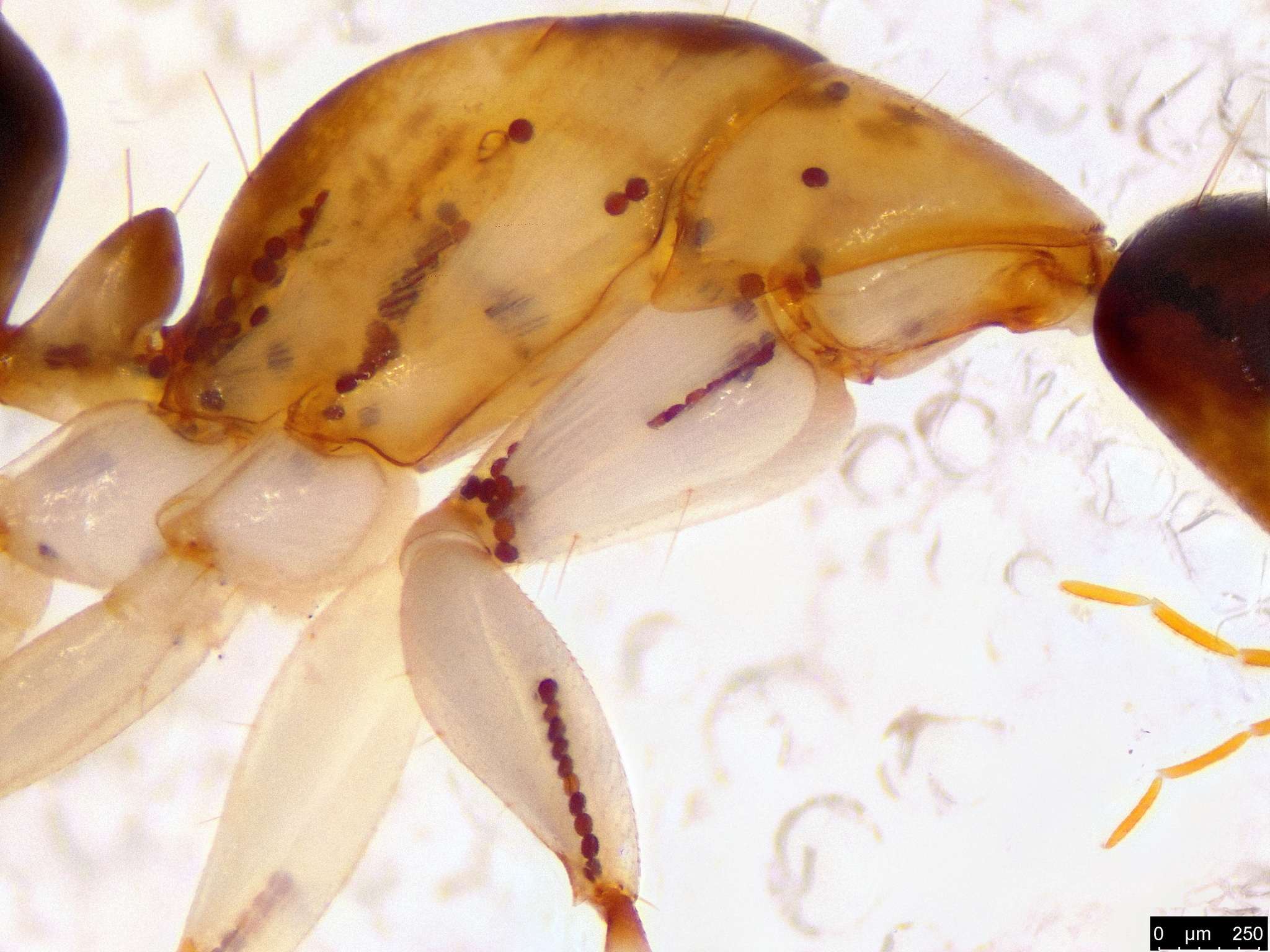
Myrmicinosporidium durum infection with spores throughout hemocoel of Camponotus claripes ant collected in Malaise trap, 15–22 January 2021, Aranda, ACT, Australia

The genus Myrmicinosporidium includes M. durum which is an endoparasite of ants.

=== Microsporidia ===
Microsporidia are obligately unicellular spore-forming organisms and are strictly intracellular parasites, and are generally host-specific and extremely dependent on their host. Almost all stages of their lifecycle can only take place inside the host cells due to their characteristics lack of mitochondria and inability to perform oxidative phosphorylation. These fungi can only survive outside of their host as spores.

Microsporidia infects 69 insect genera forming one of the largest groups of insect infecting fungi. Amblyospora spp.(a Microsporidian fungi) known to attack 79 different insect species in the order Diptera alone. Another economically important microsporidian entomopathogen is Nosema bombycis which is known to be responsible for agricultural loss through infecting and killing bees through widespread infections.

=== Entomophthoromycota ===
The phylum Entomophthoromycota are a group of true fungi which was previously classified under now rejected phylum Zygomycota. These include above 250 species of entomopathogens and some saprobes.

Most of the entomopathogens in the phylum Entomophthoromycota belong to the order Entomophthorales. Most of Entomophthorales are obligate insect pathogens and are mostly host specific making them ideal for use in insect biological control. Some prominent examples of Entomophthoralean entomopathogens include Zoopthora radicans, Z. phalloides, and Pandora neoaphidis.

=== Oomycetes ===
Although traditionally considered as a group of fungi, oomycetes do not share a common ancestor with fungi. However, they are still considered fungi-like organisms due their growth and nutritional habits. For example, oomycetes are mostly filamentous similar to fungi and acquire nutrients through external digestion of complex substrates and absorption of digestion products through cell membranes. And they also reproduce through spores. However, their production of biflagellate zoospores during asexual reproduction and their cell wall structure sets them apart from most fungi.

Most animal pathogenic oomycetes belong to either class Saprolegniomycetes or class Peronosporomycetes. There are 12 species of entomopathogenic oomycetes. Of these most notable is Lagenidium giganteum which is found in natural aerated freshwater systems. Lagenidium giganteum is known to be a facultative parasite of mosquito larvae and is proposed to be of use in mosquito biocontrol.

== Evolution of entomopathogenicity in fungi ==
The widespread taxonomic distribution of entomopathogenic fungi—with representatives including unicellular fungal parasites (e.g. Microsporidia) to more derived groups such as Ascomycota and Basidiomycota—indicates multiple evolutionary origins of pathogenicity for insects. Even within fungal orders, pathogenicity for insects may have multiple evolutionarily-independent origins. For example, three families in the order Hypocreales (Clavicipitaceae, Cordycipitaceae and Ophiocordycipitaceae) appear to have independently developed this nutritional habit.

Interkingdom host jumping may be one evolutionary mechanism for the origin of entomophagy. Cordycipitaceae fungi appear to have jumped from insect to plant to truffle, demonstrating the high flexibility of fungi for different hosts. Furthermore, acquisition and loss of entomophagy may have occurred multiple times during the evolutionary history of fungi.

The earliest fossilized remains of entomopathogenic fungi were found in Burmese amber, and are from around 99 million years ago.

== Human use ==
=== Biological control ===
Entomopathogenic fungi are a potential eco-friendly alternative to chemical insecticides. In classical biological control, there are two demonstrated examples of potential use of entomopathogenic fungi against exotic insect species affecting agriculture. The oldest example is the use of Entomophthora maimaiga against the spongy moth (Lymantria dispar) in the United States during early 1900s. The spongy moth was introduced into the United States accidentally in 1860s. Similarly, E. maimaiga was also suspected to be an accidental introduction. Despite the accidental nature of introduction, several subsequent research has found that E. maimaiga is effectively keeping spongy moth populations at control preventing outbreaks in North-east USA. The second example is the use of Zoophthora radicans against spotted alfalfa aphid (Therioaphis trifolii f. maculata) in Australia during 1979. The spotted alfalfa aphid is an exotic insect pathogen of legumes introduced to Australian pastures during 1970s. Zoophthora radicans is an entomopathogenic fungi native to Israel and capable of infecting alfalfa aphids. Research suggests that introduction of Z. radicans was effective in controlling spotted alfalfa population in Australia.

=== Bioremediation ===
Entomopathogenic fungi may be able to accumulate anthropogenic toxic compounds and therefore be used in bioremediation. For example, Metarhizium robertsii and M. brunneum have found to be highly efficient in degrading branched nonylphenols. Similarly, various strains of entomopathogenic fungi have shown efficient substrate removal of a diverse range of anthropogenic pollutants including triazines, synthetic estrogens, n-alkanes etc.

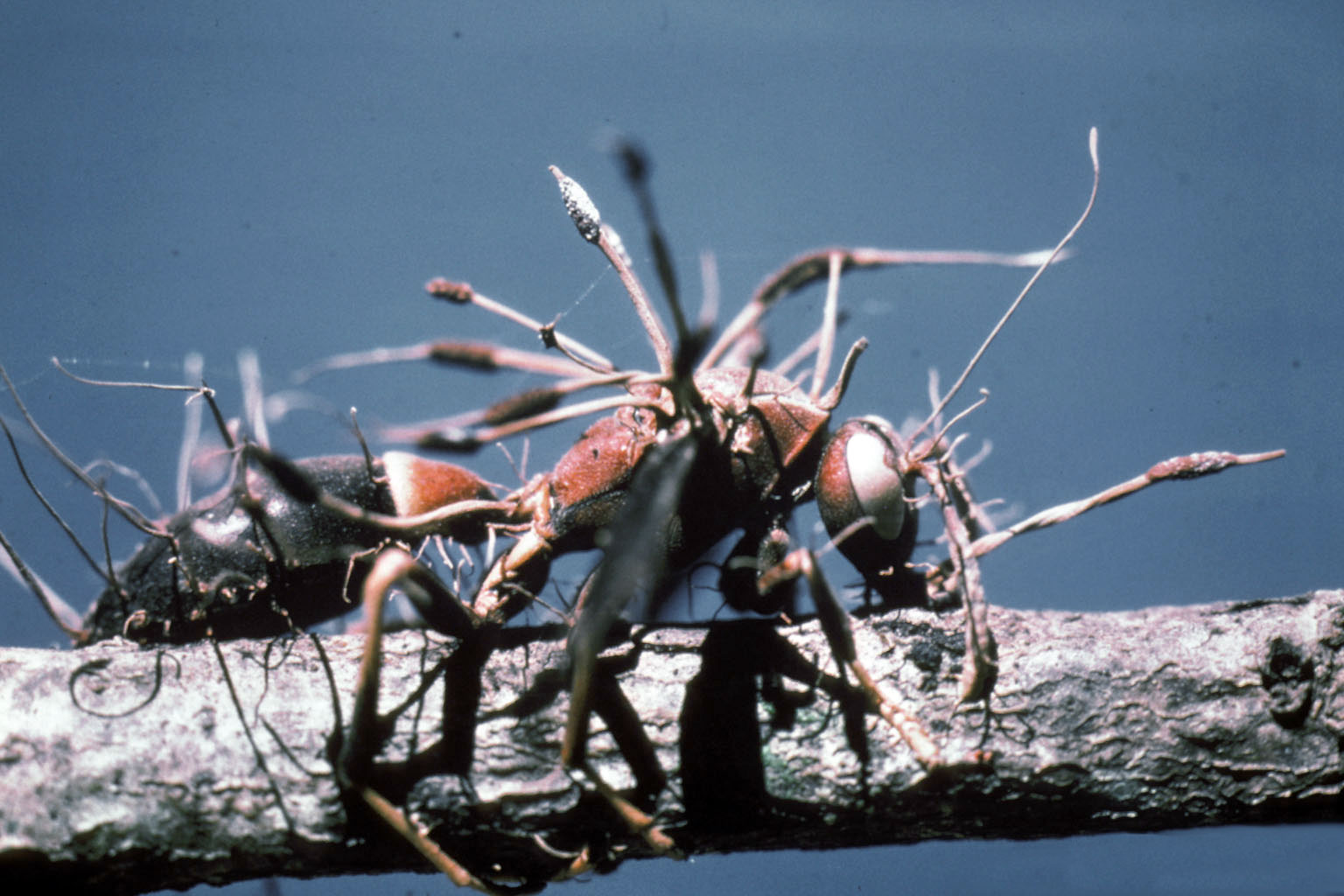
Cordyceps fungi are parasitoids of various arthropod species. Here is a wasp parasitized by the fungus Cordyceps.

== Host relationship chemical cues ==
Entomopathogenic fungi such as Beauveria bassiana and Metarhizium spp. successfully infect susceptible host populations through conidia. The signaling cues between these fungi and their host targets are under investigation. The ability to sense these parasites can increase fitness for the host targets. Evidence suggests that signal recognition occurs within some hosts, but not others. For example, the ectoparasite Cephalonomia tarsalis is susceptible to B. bassiana but it cannot detect the presence of free conidia of this fungus or infected hosts. Because they cannot detect these parasites, either the host or the host's offspring become infected and/or die. In contrast, termites detect and avoid some lethal conidia strains. Other soil-dwelling insects have evolved the ability to detect and avoid certain entomopathogenic fungi.

== See also ==
- Fungus
- Biopesticide
- Entomopathogenic nematode
- LUBILOSA and Desert locust for more on use of Metarhizium as a biological insecticide
