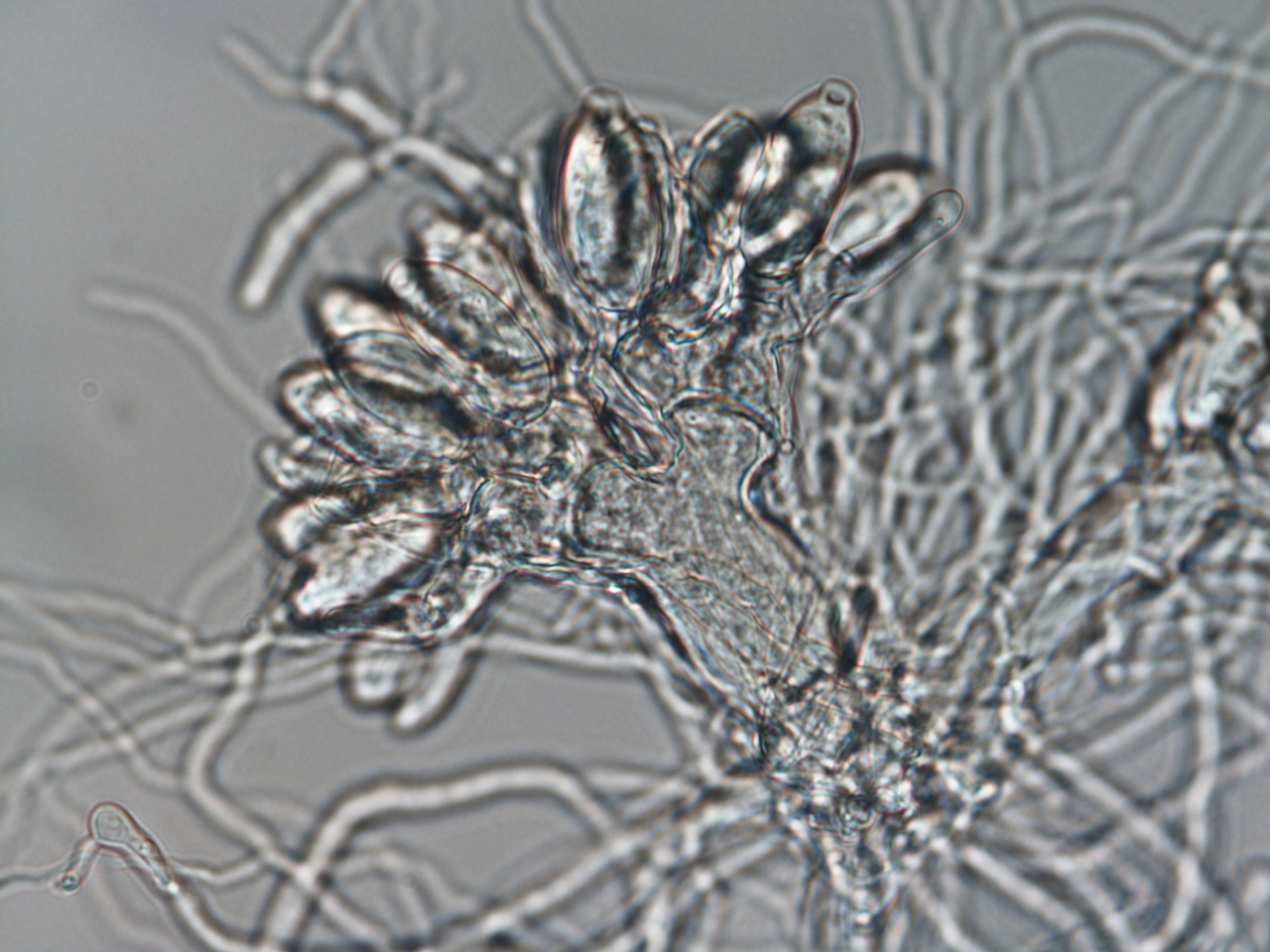

Scientific classification
- Kingdom: Fungi
- Division: Blastocladiomycota
- Class: Blastocladiomycetes
- Order: Blastocladiales
- Family: Blastocladiaceae
- Genus: Blastocladia; Reinsch (1877)

Type species
- Blastocladia pringsheimii Reinsch (1877)

Species
- 30 species

= Blastocladia =

Genus of fungi

Blastocladia is a genus of aquatic fungi.

== Description ==
Blastocladia species have a thallus that consists of a single, branched basal cell or trunk with rhizoids at one end and sporangia at the other. They are not able to use oxygen, although its presence does not inhibit growth.

== Habitat ==
Members of Blastocladia grow on submerged twigs and fruit.

== Taxonomy ==
Blastocladia was circumscribed by German scientist Paul Friedrich Reinsch in 1877, who included a single species, Blastocladia pringsheimii. Roland Thaxter added a second species, B. ramosa in 1896. He placed the genus provisionally in the Pythiaceae owing to its resemblance of its resting spores to the conidia of some members of the genus Pythium. Joseph Schröter (1897) included it with the water mold family Leptomitaceae.

== Species ==
As of December 2015, Index Fungorum accepts 30 species in Blastocladia:

- Blastocladia angusta A.Lund 1934
- Blastocladia arborata S.N.Dasgupta & R.John 1989
- Blastocladia aspergilloides Crooks 1937
- Blastocladia bonaerensis Steciow & Marano 2006 – Argentina
- Blastocladia caduca S.N.Dasgupta & R.John 1989
- Blastocladia coronata S.N.Dasgupta & R.John 1989
- Blastocladia didyma S.N.Dasgupta & R.John 1989
- Blastocladia elegans S.N.Dasgupta & R.John 1989
- Blastocladia excelsa S.N.Dasgupta & R.John 1989
- Blastocladia filamentosa S.N.Dasgupta & R.John 1989
- Blastocladia fruticosa S.N.Dasgupta & R.John 1989
- Blastocladia fusiformis S.N.Dasgupta & R.John 1989
- Blastocladia globosa Kanouse 1927
- Blastocladia glomerata Sparrow 1936
- Blastocladia gracilis Kanouse 1927
- Blastocladia heterosporangia S.N.Dasgupta & R.John 1989
- Blastocladia incrassata Indoh 1940
- Blastocladia mammillata S.N.Dasgupta & R.John 1989
- Blastocladia pileota S.N.Dasgupta & R.John 1989
- Blastocladia pringsheimii Reinsch 1877
- Blastocladia prolifera Minden 1912
- Blastocladia pusilla S.N.Dasgupta & R.John 1989
- Blastocladia ramosa Thaxt. 1896
- Blastocladia rostrata Minden 1912
- Blastocladia sessilis S.N.Dasgupta & R.John 1989
- Blastocladia sparrowii Indoh 1940
- Blastocladia spiciformis S.N.Dasgupta & R.John 1989
- Blastocladia strangulata Barrett 1912
- Blastocladia tenuis Kanouse 1927
- Blastocladia truncata Sparrow 1932
