= Entomopathogen =

Entomopathogens are pathogens that infect insects. Entomopathogens include:

- Entomopathogenic fungus
- Entomopathogenic nematode
- Entomopathogenic virus
- Entomopathogenic bacterium

== See also ==
- Arbovirus
- List of insect-borne diseases
