= Soergel =

Soergel or Sörgel is a German-language surname from a nickname for a sorrowful person from a derivative of Middle High German Sorge "sorrow", "trouble". It may refer to:

- Ed Soergel (1930–1975), Canadian football player
- Herman Sörgel (1885–1952), German architect
- Janet Soergel Mielke (1937), American politician and secretary
- Wolfgang Soergel (born 1962), German mathematician, specializing in geometry and representation theory
