= Ed Soergel =

Canadian athlete (1930–1975)

Profile
- Position: End

Personal information
- Born: April 3, 1930; Glenview, Illinois, U.S.
- Died: December 2, 1975 (aged 45); Yuma, Arizona, U.S.
- Listed height: 6 ft 0 in (1.83 m)
- Listed weight: 185 lb (84 kg)

Career information
- High school: Niles Township (Skokie, Illinois)
- College: Eastern Illinois

Career history
- 1952: Toronto Argonauts

Awards and highlights
- Grey Cup champion (1952)

Edwin Soergel (April 3, 1930 – December 2, 1975) was an American professional football player who played for the Toronto Argonauts. He won the Grey Cup with them in 1952. He previously played football at and attended Eastern Illinois University. He is a member of the Eastern Illinois Panthers Hall of Fame.
