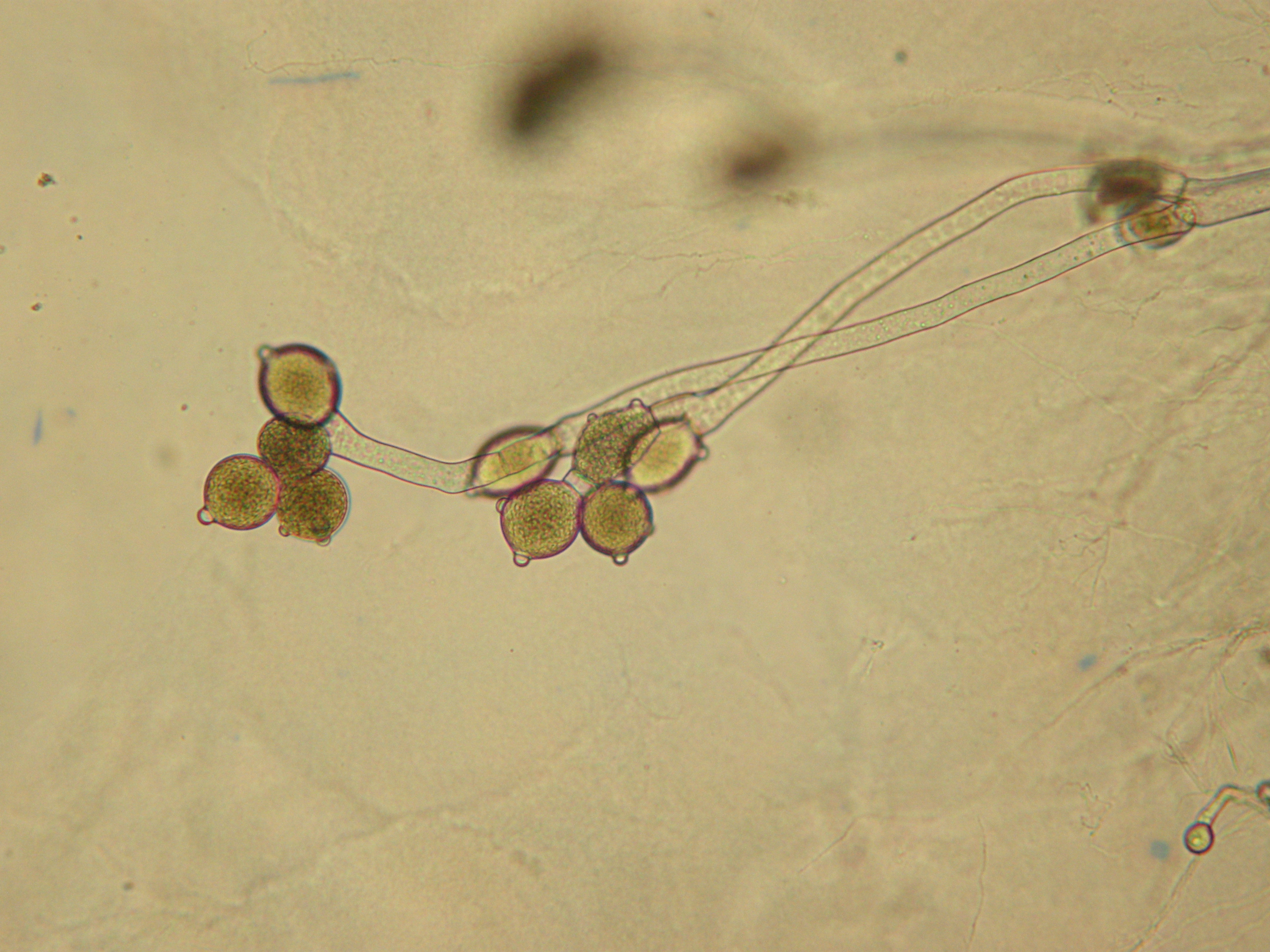
- Zoosporangia of an Allomyces sp. sporophyte growing on agar.

Scientific classification
- Domain: Eukaryota
- Kingdom: Fungi
- Division: Blastocladiomycota
- Class: Blastocladiomycetes
- Order: Blastocladiales
- Family: Blastocladiaceae
- Genus: Allomyces; E.J.Butler (1911)

Type species
- Allomyces arbusculus E.J.Butler (1911)

Synonyms
- Septocladia Coker & F.A.Grant (1922)

= Allomyces =

Genus of fungi

Allomyces is a genus of fungi in the family Blastocladiaceae. It was circumscribed by British mycologist Edwin John Butler in 1911. Species in the genus have a polycentric thallus and reproduce sexually or asexually by zoospores that have a whiplash-like flagella. They are mostly isolated from soils in tropical countries, commonly in ponds, rice fields, and slow-moving rivers.

== Morphology ==
Allomyces thalli consist of a cylindrical trunk-like basal cell that gives rise to well-developed, highly branched rhizoids that anchor the thallus to the substrate. The trunk-like basal cell also gives rise to numerous dichotomously branched side branches that terminate as either resistant sporangia, zoosporangia, or gametangia depending on the life cycle stage. Septa are sometimes present especially at the base of reproductive organs.

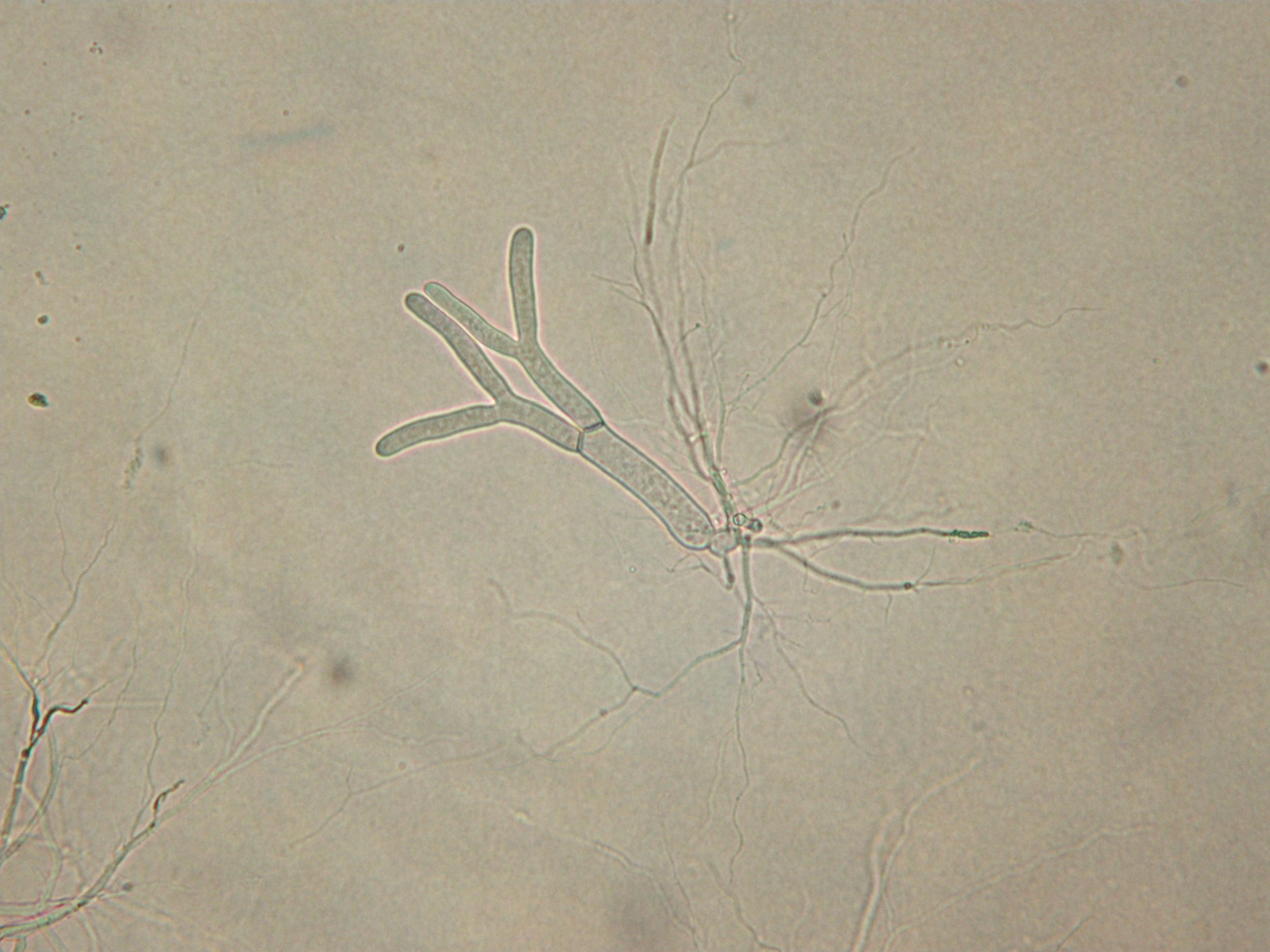
Germling of Allomyces strain WJD103 on nutrient agar. Note the trunk-like basal cell separated from the dichotomously branched branches that will give rise to the reproductive organs.

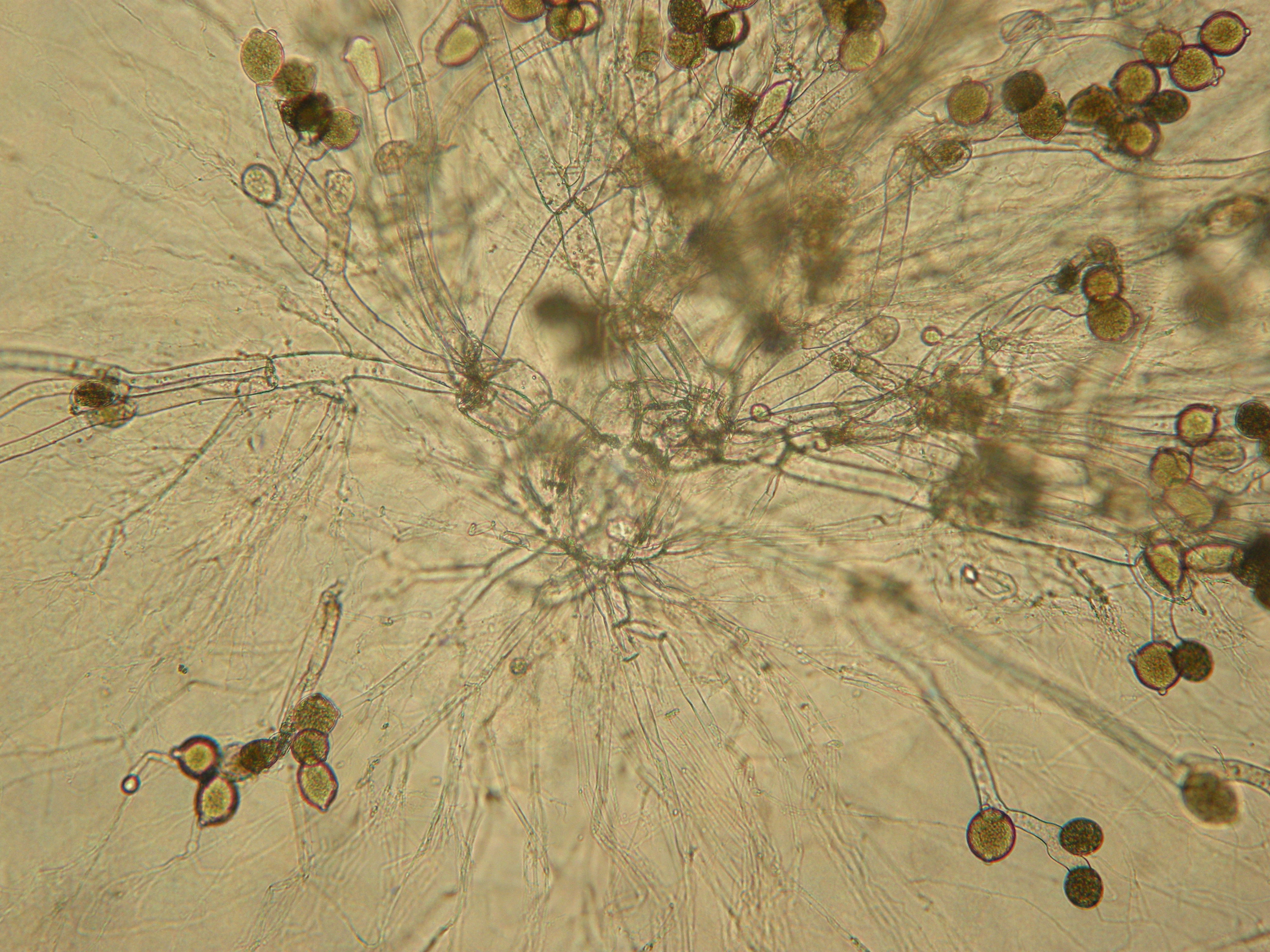
Zoomed out view of a mature thallus of Allomyces strain WJD103. Note the orange-brown zoosporangia and resting sporangia at the terminals of the branches.

== Life cycle and mating ==
There are three distinct life cycles in Allomyces, and some authors delineate the subgenera Euallomyces, Cystogenes, and Brachyallomyces based on the life cycles while others do not. Euallomyces and Brachyallomyces are known to be classified as polyphyletic, but Cystogenes is monophyletic.

The Euallomyces life cycle is an anisogamous alternation of generations between a haploid gametophyte and a diploid sporophyte. In this life cycle, the two stages are indistinguishable until reproductive organs are formed. Gametophytes produce colorless female gametangia and orange male gametangia; the orange coloration is transferred to the male gametes and is due to the presence of gamma carotenoid. Formation of male gametes is faster than of female gametes. Both male and female gametangia release motile gametes, but the male gametes are smaller and orange. Female gametangia and gametes release a pheromone called sirenin that attracts the male gametes. Male gametes produce a pheromone called parisin. Female gametes are sluggish and stay close to the female gametangia that sets up a strong concentration gradient of sirenin. Fertilization of female gametes by male gametes appears to be near 100% efficient. Fertilization takes place when two gametes contact one another. The plasma membranes fuse to form a binucleate cell with nuclear fusion quickly following. The resulting zygote is initially biflagellate, but it soon encysts and germinates. It grows into a dichotomously branched sporophyte that forms two types of sporangia: thin-walled zoosporangia that may be colorless or orange and thick-walled resting sporangia that are reddish-brown due to the presence of melanin pigments. The thin-walled zoosporangia give rise to motile zoospores that germinate and grow into another sporophyte. The resting sporangia undergo meiosis at germination and give rise to haploid zoospores that will germinate and grow into gametophytes.

In Cystogenes life cycle the resting sporangia (from the sporophyte) give rise to biflagellated, bi-nucleated zoospores that will encyst, undergo meiosis, and germinate to yield motile gametes. These gametes will then fuse in pairs and the resulting zygotes germinate and grow into new sporophytes.

In the Brachyallomyces life cycle, the gametophytic stage is missing altogether.

== Ecology ==
Allomyces species seem to have a global distribution and are readily isolated from soils and waters by baiting with a sterile seed. Species of Allomyces can be parasitized by Catenaria allomycis, Rozella allomycis, and Olpidium allomycetos.

== Taxonomy ==
The genus was circumscribed in 1911 by Butler and numerous species have been described. Based on type of life cycle, Emerson delineated three subgenera: Euallomyces, Cystogenes, and Brachyallomyces. Based on a molecular phylogeny using portions of the nuclear ribosome, it appears Euallomyces and Brachyallomyces are polyphyletic, but Cystogenes is monophyletic. Moreover, it appears several species in the genus are polyphyletic.

== Species ==
- Allomyces anomalus R.Emers. 1941
- Allomyces arbusculus E.J.Butler 1911
- Allomyces catenoides Sparrow 1964
- Allomyces cystogenus R.Emers. 1941
- Allomyces javanicus Kniep 1929
- Allomyces macrogynus (R.Emers.) R.Emers. & C.M.Wilson 1954
- Allomyces moniliformis Coker & Braxton 1926
- Allomyces neomoniliformis Indoh 1940
- Allomyces reticulatus R. Emers. & J.A.Robertson 1974
- Allomyces strangulata Minden 1916
