= Blastocladiella =

Scientific classification
- Domain: Eukaryota
- Kingdom: Fungi
- Division: Blastocladiomycota
- Class: Blastocladiomycetes
- Order: Blastocladiales
- Family: Blastocladiaceae
- Genus: Blastocladiella; Matthews (1937)

Synonyms
- Clavochytridium Couch and Cox (1939); Sphaerocladia Stueben (1939)

Genus of fungi

Blastocladiella is a genus of fungus.

== Species ==
- Blastocladiella anabaenae
- Blastocladiella asperosperma
- Blastocladiella britannica
- Blastocladiella colombiensis
- Blastocladiella cystogena
- Blastocladiella emersonii
- Blastocladiella laevisperma
- Blastocladiella microcystogena
- Blastocladiella novae-zelandiae
- Blastocladiella simplex
- Blastocladiella stomophilum
- Blastocladiella stuebenii
- Blastocladiella variabilis
