= Frederick Kroeber Sparrow =

American mycologist

- Born: May 11, 1903
- Died: October 2, 1977 (aged 74)
- Citizenship: United States
- Education: University of Michigan; Harvard University
- Scientific career
- Fields: Mycology

Frederick Kroeber Sparrow (11 May 1903–October 2 1977) was an American mycologist. He was known for his research on aquatic fungi, and in particular the genus Physoderma, and he produced a well-received monograph in 1943 titled The Aquatic Phycomycetes Exclusive of the Saprolegniacea and Pythium; this was republished in 1960 as Aquatic Phycomycetes.

== Background ==
Born in Washington, D.C., the only child of Minnie Tomlinson and Frederick Kroeber Sparrow, Sparrow attended local schools and developed an early interest in science. It was during these years he met (John E.) Jack Faber, who held his same interests and later became a microbiologist specializing in bacteriology, and a lacrosse coach. Sparrow attended the University of Michigan for his undergraduate degree where he met Anna Gabler, who he married in 1925. He also earned his undergraduate degree in 1925, and entered Harvard University as a graduate student that year. He obtained a master's degree in 1926 and his PhD in 1929.

== Career ==
His graduate years at Harvard consisted of research on the genus Pythium. He tackled an array of topics concerning this group, such as classification, occurrence, and the discovery of new species. Early in his research, he had achieved a thorough understanding of this group and proceeded to publish the paper Occurrence of Pythium gracile in the United States in 1927. During his tenure at Harvard, well-known botanists G. Ledyard Stebbins and Adriance S. Foster attended as graduate students. He also had some notable mentors such as Professor Merritt Lyndon Fernald and Professor W. A. Weston Jr.

In 1929, following his time at Harvard, Frederick K. Sparrow joined the faculty of Dartmouth College as an instructor, and later as the assistant Professor of Biology. While at Harvard, he had worked at the Cold Spring Harbor Biological Station over the summers as the Assistant in Ecology. It was here that completed the research used to later publish his first paper on chytridiaceous fungi at Dartmouth. This was the start of nearly a half-century of work on aquatic fungi that made him one of the most notable mycologists of his time.

After his second year at Dartmouth, Sparrow spent a year in a National Research Council Fellowship at Cornell University where he became good friends with H. H. Whetzel, a renowned pioneer of plant pathology, and was exposed to a great number of aquatic fungi in the area. Here, he distinguished operculate and inoperculate chytrids in two separate papers in 1933, which was a convention to be adopted in the taxonomy of Chytridiales. The following year, Sparrow traveled to Europe and worked at many notable universities, such as Cambridge, University of Copenhagen, and The Botany School. It was during this stay that he grew fond of the genus Physoderma and began a long journey describing and studying this group. He did find a great challenge in working with them, due to the obligate nature of the plant parasites of this genus. This time in Europe provided Sparrow with his first exposure to a vast array of marine fungi and he befriended a great colleague at Copenhagen, Dr. H. E. Peterson. The genus name "Petersenia", one of the many groups described by Sparrow, was named in honor of his friendship and work with Peterson. His summers from 1934 to 1936 were spent at the Woods Hole Oceanographic Institute Research Fellowship, where his knowledge of aquatic plants benefited his study of parasitic aquatic fungi.

In 1936, Frederick K. Sparrow returned to Michigan as an assistant professor of botany at his alma mater, and eventually became a professor of botany in 1949. He remained a faculty member for 37 years. During this time, he taught several courses, and was considered to be an amazing professor nd researcher who cared a lot for his students and colleagues. In 1956 he returned to The Botany School in Cam,bridge ,to conduct more research on the aquatic fungi in Europe. In 1967 he became the acting director of the Biological Station at the University of Michigan and, due to his excellent work, was promoted to director in 1968. He even traveled to other universities for periods of time as a visiting professor. He visited the University of Hawaii and University of California Berkeley in 1963 and 1966 respectively, and acted as visiting professor at the University of South Florida and the University of Florida after his retirement. In 1963, Sparrow suffered a great loss, when one of his most promising students and successors to his work with chytridiaceous fungi, Robert M. Johns, died tragically. The species Physoderma johnsii was named by Sparrow in his honor. His studies at the Woods Hole Oceanographic Institute were continued at the University of Washington Friday Harbor Marine Lab during the summers of 1968 and 1972.

In 1973, Frederick Kroeber Sparrow retired and lived with his wife in Ann Arbor, Michigan, where he continued to enjoy literature and science. At the International Mycological Congress in 1977, Sparrow gave an address on Anton de Bary who, aside from being a pioneer of the description and classification of the genus Physoderma (which was a great interest of Sparrow's), was crucial in the foundation of modern mycology and plant pathology. Sparrow died a few months later, on October 2.

=== Contributions to the Field ===
Most of his contributions revolved around his specialty, aquatic fungi, and particular groups within aquatic fungi that he spent years researching, such as Physoderma and Pythium.

Sparrow's two papers on operculate and inoperculate chytrids had a great influence on Chytridales taxonomy. With these two papers, he noted the separation in the phylogeny of these two groups, which is a concept that is still used today.

He also established significant features for distinguishing Physoderma. He exhibited that the prior methods of characterizing individuals of this genus, host specificity and size of resting spores, were not viable.

He published numerous books and articles, mainly on the topic of aquatic fungi and specific taxa he worked on. Sparrow's greatest contribution to mycology was likely his book titled The Aquatic Phycomycetes exclusive of the Saprolegniaceae and Pythium, published in 1943. The second edition, titled Aquatic Phycomycetes, is on equal standing. The second edition contained updated information on the order Plasmodiophorales, the family Saprolegniaceae, and the genus Physoderma, along with new information on aquatic individuals in the genera Pythium and Phytophthora.

He made incredible progress regarding the discovery, classification, and ecology of many individuals in the family of the Thraustochytriaceae, containing a genus of his own naming, Thraustochytrium. These organisms were also a part of the Phycomycete group.

=== Achievements ===
Aside from his success as a researcher and professor, Frederick K Sparrow also held numerous titles and won many awards in his field.

In 1944, Sparrow was awarded the Russel Award at University of Michigan for his excellent teaching, which is the highest award able to be given to an undergraduate instructor.

Sparrow served under various positions for the Mycological Society of America, including secretary-treasurer from 1945 to 1948, vice-president in 1948, and president in 1949. He was also the president of the Michigan Academy of Arts, Sciences, and Letters in 1954.

He was the honorary vice president of the 10th International Botanical Congress in Edinburgh in 1964. Sparrow was then awarded the Award of Merit by the Botanical Society of America in 1968, the same year he was elected a Fellow of the American Association for the Advancement of Science. In 1977, Sparrow was the president of the 2nd International Mycological Congress in Tampa, Florida.

== Other ==
Frederick K. Sparrow was known among his students and colleagues to speak very well and chose his words wisely. This likely stemmed from his love and vast knowledge of literature.

Sparrow's wife, Anna (Nan) Gabler also attended the University of Michigan and was a literary scholar. She became highly active in the Episcopal church, actively participating in church policy discussions. She frequently urged other women to do the same, which Sparrow was incredibly supportive of. He was known to be very progressive with regards to women's equality and encouraged his wife's participation. This was especially observed with his female students, whom he welcomed into his lab and treated like colleagues.

He had two sons, Frederick T. Sparrow Sr., and George B. Sparrow, five grandsons, and one granddaughter.

The best-known example of his author abbreviation is Rhizophydium stipitatum Sparrow 1957.

== Notable publications ==
- Sparrow, F.K. (1971). A general review of biflagellate fungi. In Ainsworth, G.C.; Webster, J. [eds], Abstracts, First International Mycological Congress, Exeter, September 1971 p. 90. [Exeter]; [The Congress].
- Sparrow, F.K. (1946). Observations on two chytrids parasitic on phanerogams. I. Physoderma menyanthes de Bary. American Journal of Botany 33: 112–118, 41 figs.
- Sparrow, F.K. (1947). Observations on chytridiaceous parasites of phanerogams. II. A preliminary study of the occurrence of ephemeral sporangia in the Physoderma disease of maize. American Journal of Botany 34: 94–97, 17 figs.
- Sparrow, F.K. (1947). Observations on chytridiaceous parasites of phanerogams. III. Physoderma claytoniana and an associated parasite. American Journal of Botany 34: 325–329, 17 figs.
- Sparrow, F.K. (1957). Observations on chytridiaceous parasites of phanerogams. VII. A Physoderma on Lycopus americanus. American Journal of Botany 44 (8): 661–665, 1 pl.
- Sparrow, F.K. (1964). Observations on chytridiaceous parasites of phanerogams. XIV. Physoderma calami. American Journal of Botany 51 (9): 958–963, 27 figs, 1 table.
- Sparrow, F.K. (1943). Aquatic Phycomycetes Exclusive of the Saprolegniaceae and Pythium. xix + 785 pp., 1 pl., 69 figs. UK, London; USA, Michigan, Ann Arbor; Oxford University Press; University of Michigan Press.
- Sparrow, F.K. (1950). The expanding horizons of mycology. Mycologia 42 (6): 683–692, portrait.
- Sparrow, F.K. (1952). Phycomycetes from the Douglas Lake region of northern Michigan. Mycologia 44 (6): 759–772.
- Sparrow, F.K. (1953). A new species of Monoblepharella. Mycologia 45 (4): 592–595, 1 fig.
- Sparrow, F.K. (1956). Observations on chytridiaceous parasites of phanerogams. V. The occurrence of Physoderma butomi and P. vagans in the United States. Mycologia 48 (5): 765–766.
- Sparrow, F.K. (1957). Observations on chytridiaceous parasites of phanerogams. VI. Resting spore germination in Physoderma (Urophlyctis) pluriannulatum. Mycologia 49 (3): 426–429, 1 fig.
- Sparrow, F.K. (1964). A new species of Allomyces. Mycologia 56 (3): 460–461.
- Sparrow, F.K. (1965). Concerning Physoderma graminis. Mycologia 57 (4): 624–627, 2 figs.
- Sparrow, F.K. (1965). The occurrence of Physoderma in Hawaii, with notes on other Hawaiian phycomycetes. Mycopathologia et Mycologia Applicata 25 (1-2): 119–143, 78 figs.
- Sparrow, F.K. (1961). Observations on chytridiaceous parasites of phanerogams. X. Notes on some species of Physoderma occurring in the Douglas Lake region of northern Michigan. Papers from the Michigan Academy of Science, Arts and Letters 46: 183–194.
- Sparrow, F.K. (1976). The present status of classification in biflagellate fungi. In Jones, E.B.G. [ed.], Recent Advances in Aquatic Mycology pp. 213–222. London; Elek Science.
- Sparrow, F.K. (1952). A contribution to our knowledge of the Phycomycetes of Cuba. I. Revista de la Sociedad Cubana de Botánica 9 (2): 34–40, 23 figs.
- Sparrow, F.K. (1952). A contribution to our knowledge of the Phycomycetes of Cuba. II. Revista de la Sociedad Cubana de Botánica 9 (3): 68–74, 23 figs.
- Sparrow, F.K. (1952). A contribution to our knowledge of the Phycomycetes of Cuba. III. Revista de la Sociedad Cubana de Botánica 9 (4): 104–108, 23 figs.
- Sparrow, F.K. (1927). Occurrence of Pythium gracile in the United States. Rhodora 29: 37–39.
- Sparrow, F.K. (1951). Podochytrium cornutum n.sp., the cause of an epidemic on the planktonic diatom Stephanodiscus. Transactions of the British Mycological Society 34 (2): 170–173, 1 fig.
- Sparrow, F.K. (1953). Observations on chytridiaceous parasites of phanerogams. IV. Physoderma aponogetonia sp.nov. parasitic on Aponogeton. Transactions of the British Mycological Society 36 (4): 347–348, 1 fig.
- Sparrow, F.K. (1957). A further contribution to the phycomycete flora of Great Britain. Transactions of the British Mycological Society 40 (4): 523–537, 2 figs.
- Sparrow, F.K.; Barr, M.E. (1955). Additions to the phycomycete flora of the Douglas Lake region. I. New taxa and records. Mycologia 47 (4): 546–556, 27 figs.
- Sparrow, F.K.; Griffin, J.E. (1961). Observations on chytridiaceous parasites of phanerogams. XII. Further studies of Physoderma claytonianum var. sparrowii. Arch. Microbiol. 40 (3): 275–282, 18 figs.
- Sparrow, F.K.; Griffin, J.E. (1964). Observations on chytridiaceous parasites of phanerogams. XV. Host range and species concept studies in Physoderma. Archiv für Mikrobiologie 49 (2): 103–111, 3 tables.
- Sparrow, F.K.; Griffin, J.E.; Johns, R.M. (1961). Observations on chytridiaceous parasites of phanerogams. XI. A Physoderma on Agropyron repens. American Journal of Botany 48 (9): 850–858, 23 figs.
- Sparrow, F.K.; Johns, R.M. (1965). Observations on chytridiaceous parasites of phanerogams. XVI. Notes on Physoderma from Scirpeae. Archiv für Mikrobiologie 51 (4): 351–364, 15 figs, 1 table.
- Sparrow, F.K.; Paterson, R.A. (1955). A note concerning Rhizidiopsis and Podochytrium. Mycologia 47 (2): 272–274.
- Sparrow, F.K.; Paterson, R.A.; Johns, R.M. (1965). Additions to the phycomycete flora of the Douglas Lake region. V. New or interesting fungi. Papers from the Michigan Academy of Science, Arts and Letters 50 (1): 115–123, 1 fig.
- Sparrow, F.K. (1933) Observations on operculate chytridiaceous fungi collected in the vicinity of Ithaca, N. Y. Amer. J. Bot. 20: 63-7 1933
- Sparrow, F.K. (1933) Inoperculate chytridiaceous organisms collected in the vicinity of Ithaca, N. Y., with notes on other aquatic fungi. Mycologia 25: 531-53

== See also ==
- List of mycologists
