= Ralph Emerson (botanist) =

American botanist

Ralph Emerson (1912–1979) was an American botanist, academic, and professor at the University of California, Berkeley who made contributions to the fields of botany, biology, and mycology through his years of research and emphasis on aquatic and thermophilic fungi.

== Biography ==
Ralph Emerson was born in 1912 in New York City, the youngest of five children of Grace and Haven Emerson.

He spent his early life in New York City before attending Harvard University to obtain his bachelor's degree, master's, and PhD successively. During this time, he began his research into aquatic fungi, specifically the Allomyces, a research passion that would continue with him for most of his academic career. Following his PhD, Emerson spent two years as a National Research Council fellow, and one year back at Harvard as a research fellow. In 1940 he began his career as a professor at the University of California – Berkeley. He remained at UC Berkeley for most of the rest of his academic career, minus two sabbaticals to Costa Rica.

In 1935, Emerson was a photographer for an expedition to the west coast of Mexico whose goal was to gather data and photographs of the local fish in order to put together a book on the Pacific Coastal game fish. According to a distinguished ichthyologist, Emerson's photos were some of the best he had ever seen.

He married Enid Merle Budelman in 1942, together having two children, Peter and Grace Emerson.

Throughout his life, Emerson contributed greatly to the scientific community, as well as through his dedicated and passionate teaching efforts before dying after a year-long battle with cancer. He died in 1979, at age 67, survived by his wife, two children, and six grandchildren.

== Areas of study ==
Since the beginning of his academic career, Emerson had an interest in water molds, beginning with the genus Allomyces. His focus was broadly biological, focusing on growth and nutritional requirements, but with an ultimate goal of classification and biosystematics. One of his major contributions was a paper on the cytogenetics and cytotaxonomy of Allomyces. Beyond this and other common water molds, Emerson made major contributions with his research on thermophiles, especially in Eumycota, on fermentative water molds, and in looking for low oxygen tolerant tropical water molds on his sabbaticals to Costa Rica.

== Honors ==
Emerson gained many offices and honors throughout his career, both in the United States and internationally. He held Guggenheim Fellowships for the academic years 1948–1949 and 1956–1957. He was elected a member of the National Academy of Sciences as well as the Academy of Arts and Sciences, and served as president of the Mycological Society of America and Botanical Society of America. He held international positions, was awarded as a fellow in multiple international organizations, and was a keynote speaker for the First International Mycological Congress. At the University of California, Berkeley, Emerson started as an instructor and worked his way up to professor, research professor, and finally chairman of the botany department.
