= Coelomomyces =

Scientific classification
- Kingdom: Fungi
- Division: Blastocladiomycota
- Class: Blastocladiomycetes
- Order: Blastocladiales
- Family: Coelomomycetaceae
- Genus: Coelomomyces; Keilin, 1921

Species
- Many, including: Coelomomyces elegans; Coelomomyces opifexi; Coelomomyces psorophorae; Coelomomyces punctatus; Coelomomyces stegomyiae Keilin 1921 (type)

Synonyms
- Zografia Bogayavlensky 1922

Genus of fungi

Coelomomyces is the only genus of fungi in the family Coelomomycetaceae. Species in the genus can be used as agents for the biological control of mosquitoes.

== Characteristics ==
Coelomomyces are obligate parasites of mosquitoes and chironomids, meaning that they require their hosts to complete their lifecycle. One species, Coelomomyces psorophorae, is even heteroecious; it requires two completely different hosts as part of its life cycle over the generations, larvae of both the mosquito Culiseta inornata as well as the copepod Cyclops venalis. Due to their lethal nature and host specificity, they have been used by humans for biological control of mosquitoes and other insects.

The mycelium of Coelomomyces spreads among infected mosquito larva. As the larvae disintegrate, the sporangia break free and are released to spread the fungus, sometimes among copepods who will die after nurturing the fungus for a time. The exact path differs from species to species and case to case; sometimes the + and - gametes are present in the same host and can grow there, although they can also fuse outside the host and form a motile zygote that must find susceptible mosquito larvae to complete its life cycle.

== Species ==
Coelomomyces contains the following species:

- Coelomomyces stegomyiae Keilin 1921 (type)
- Coelomomyces africanus A.J. Walker 1985 *Coelomomyces angolensis H. Ribeiro 1992
- Coelomomyces anophelesicus A.V.V. Iyengar 1962
- Coelomomyces arcellaneus Couch & Lum 1985
- Coelomomyces arsenjevii Koval & E.S. Kuprian. 1981
- Coelomomyces ascariformis Van Thiel 1962
- Coelomomyces azerbaijanicus E.S. Kuprian. & Koval 1986
- Coelomomyces beirnei Weiser & McCauley 1972
- Coelomomyces bisymmetricus Couch & H.R. Dodge ex Couch 1962i hjにゅ7
- Coelomomyces borealis Couch & Service 1985
- Coelomomyces cairnsensis Laird 1962
- Coelomomyces canadensis (Weiser & McCauley) Nolan 1978
- Coelomomyces carolinianus Couch, Umphlett & H.A. Bond 1985
- Coelomomyces celatus Couch & Hembree 1985
- Coelomomyces chironomi Rasín 1929
- Coelomomyces ciferrii Leão 1965
- Coelomomyces couchii Nolan & B.Taylor 1979
- Coelomomyces cribrosus Couch & H.R. Dodge ex Couch 1962
- Coelomomyces dentialatus Couch & Rajap. 1985
- Coelomomyces dodgei Couch 1962
- Coelomomyces dubitskii Couch & Bland 1985
- Coelomomyces elegans Couch & Rajap. 1985
- Coelomomyces fasciatus Couch & A.V.V. Iyengar 1985
- Coelomomyces finlayae Laird 1962
- Coelomomyces grassei Rioux & Pech 1962
- Coelomomyces iliensis Dubitskii, Dzerzh. & Daneb. 1973
- Coelomomyces indicus A.V.V. Iyengar 1962
- Coelomomyces iyengarii Couch 1985
- Coelomomyces keilinii Couch & H.R. Dodge ex Couch 1962
- Coelomomyces lacunosus Couch & O.E. Sousa 1985
- Coelomomyces lairdii Maffi & Nolan 1977
- Coelomomyces lativittatus Couch & H.R. Dodge ex Couch 1962
- Coelomomyces macleayae Laird 1962
- Coelomomyces madagascaricus Couch & Grjebine 1985
- Coelomomyces milkoi Dudka & Koval 1973
- Coelomomyces musprattii Couch 1985
- Coelomomyces neotropicus Lichtw. & L.D. Gómez 1993
- Coelomomyces notonectae (Bogoyavl.) Keilin 1927
- Coelomomyces omorii Laird, Nolan & Mogi 1975
- Coelomomyces opifexi Pillai & J.M.B. Sm. 1968
- Coelomomyces orbicularis Couch & Muspratt 1985
- Coelomomyces orbiculostriatus Couch & Pras. 1985
- Coelomomyces pentangulatus Couch 1962
- Coelomomyces ponticulus Nolan & Mogi 1980
- Coelomomyces psorophorae Couch 1962
- Coelomomyces punctatus Couch & H.R. Dodge ex Couch 1962
- Coelomomyces quadrangulatus Couch 1962
- Coelomomyces raffaelei Coluzzi & Rioux 1962
- Coelomomyces reticulatus Couch & A.J. Walker 1985
- Coelomomyces rugosus Couch & Service 1985
- Coelomomyces sculptosporus Couch & H.R. Dodge ex Couch 1962
- Coelomomyces seriostriatus Couch & J.B. Davies 1985
- Coelomomyces solomonis Laird 1962
- Coelomomyces stegomyiae Keilin 1921 type specie
- Coelomomyces sulcatus Couch & A.V.V. Iyengar 1985
- Coelomomyces tasmaniensis Laird 1962
- Coelomomyces thailandensis Couch, D. Gould & Hembree 1985
- Coelomomyces triangulatus Couch & W.W. Martin 1985
- Coelomomyces tuberculatus Bland & Rodhain 1985
- Coelomomyces tuzetiae Manier, Rioux, F. Coste & Maurand 1970
- Coelomomyces uranotaeniae Couch 1945
- Coelomomyces utahensis Romney, Couch & L.T. Nielsen 1985
- Coelomomyces walkeri Van Thiel 1962
