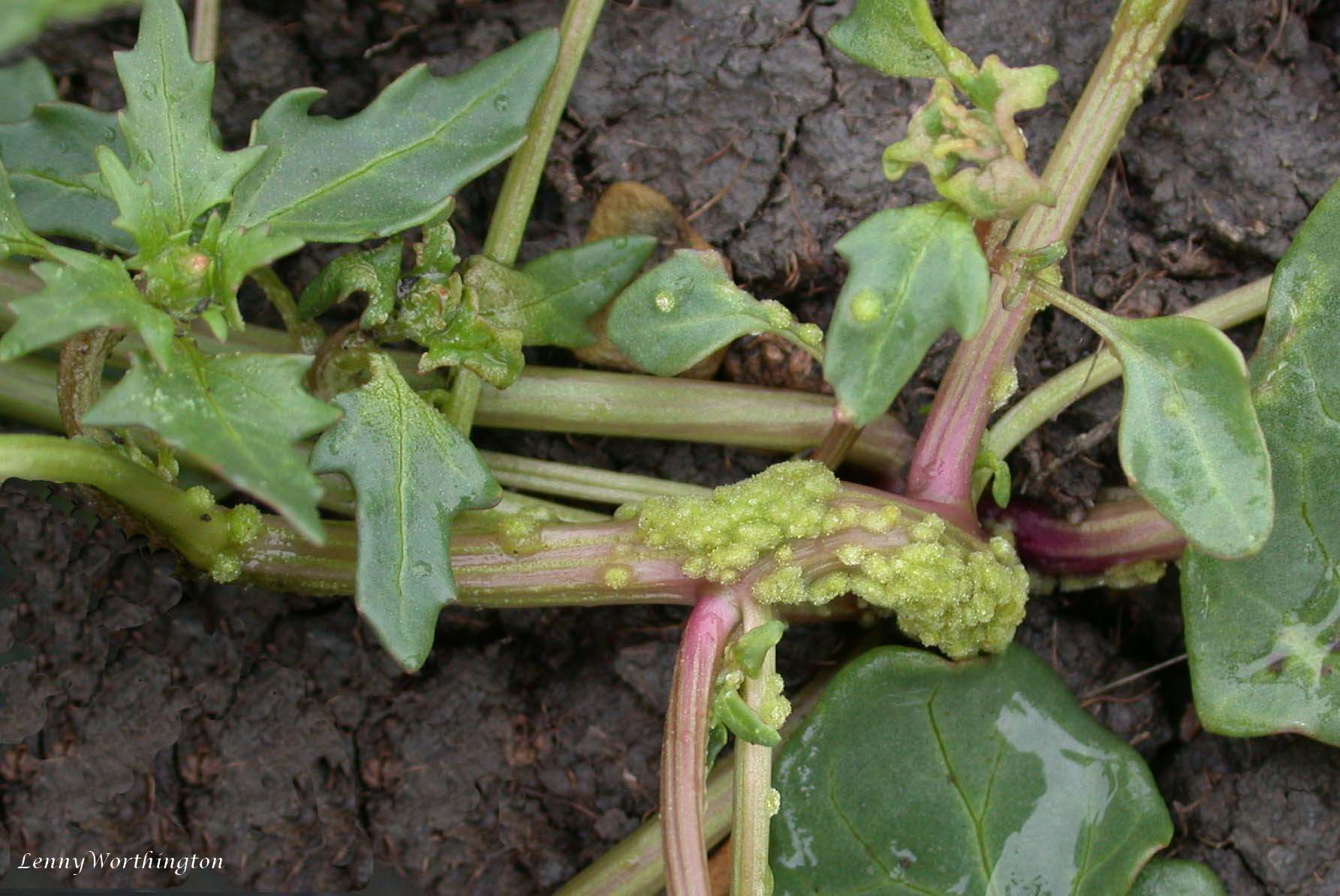
- Physoderma pulposum on Chenopodium

Scientific classification
- Kingdom: Fungi
- Division: Blastocladiomycota
- Class: Physodermatomycetes
- Order: Physodermatales
- Family: Physodermataceae
- Genus: Physoderma; Wallr. (1833)

Type species
- Physoderma maculare (1833) Wallr. (1833)

Synonyms
- Oedomyces Sacc. ex Trab. (1894); Urophlyctis J.Schröt. (1886)

= Physoderma =

Genus of fungi

Physoderma is a genus of chytrid fungi. Described by German botanist Karl Friedrich Wilhelm Wallroth in 1833, the genus contains some species that are parasitic on vascular plants, including P. alfalfae and P. maydis, causative agents of crown wart of alfalfa and brown spot of corn, respectively. Of the chytrid genera, Physoderma is the oldest. However, species were confused with the rust fungi, the genus Synchytrium, and the genus Protomyces of Ascomycota. Members of Physoderma are obligate parasites of pteridophytes and angiosperms. There are approximately 80 species within this genus (depending on whether one includes those traditionally belonging to Urophlyctis).

== Taxonomic history ==
The genus was erected in 1833 on the basis of resting spore development. and included six species. Unfortunately, his original diagnosis was very similar to that of Protomyces, which led others to place species in the wrong genus. In 1877, Nowakowski erected the genus Cladochytrium in the Chytridiales, which led to the transfer of Physoderma to the Chytridiales as well by Schroeter in 1883. Just prior to that (1882), Schroeter added an additional four species to the genus and noted, for the first time, epibiotic, ephemeral zoosporangia. He also claimed that sexual reproduction was through the fusion of two cells and resulted in the resting spores. In 1889, Schroeter created the genus Urophlyctis for those species with epibiotic, ephemeral zoosporangia and sexually derived resting spores. He placed both in the same subfamily as Cladochytrium. In 1891, Fischer refuted Schroeter's observations on sexual reproduction and merged Physoderma and Urophlyctis with Cladochytrium. In 1897, Schroeter separated them once more. Magnus, in 1901, used characteristics of the resting spore and host plant reaction to distinguish between Physoderma and Urophlyctis. He claimed that resting spores from Physoderma were globose and ellipsoidal, and those from Urophlyctis were flattened on one side. Physoderma species cause discoloration and slight malformation, while Urophlycits cause significant malformation and hypertrophy. Fredrick Kroeber Sparrow, in numerous publications, expressed concerns over the characters used to distinguish the two genera. In 1943, Sparrow suggested that the genus be merged with Urophlyctis, which was done by Karling in 1950. He also moved Physoderma to its own family, the Physodermataceae. Sparrow, in 1962, decided the genera were distinct based on morphology and host reaction. However, at this time, the two genera are considered synonymous. Typically, it was thought that Physoderma was related to the polycentric genera Cladochytrium and Nowakowskiella. Based on the ultrastructure of the zoospore, it was realized that Physoderma belongs to the Blastocladiales, which later became the Blastocladiomycota. Recent phylogenetic analyses indicate that Physoderma and Urophlyctis might be separate genera.

== Morphology & life cycle ==
Physoderma species are characterized as having a both a monocentric thallus and an endobiotic polycentric thallus. Resting spores germinate in the spring to produce zoospores that will infect the host. The initial infection gives rise to monocentric, epibiotic zoosporangium anchored with endobiotic rhizoids confined to a single host cell. The zoosporangium has been characterized as Rhizidium or Phlyctochytrium like; it usually has discharge papilla through which the zoospores are released. (Physoderma is considered operculate, though some species once in Urophlyctis appear to be inoperculate.) The liberated zoospores infect new host cells, and in this fashion, an infection can go through several generations. As well, the sporangia are internally proliferous; that is, they can produce a second round of zoospores after releasing the first one. In late spring and summer, the zoospores will begin to develop into an endobiotic polycentric thallus. This thallus is often extensive, infecting many host cells, with highly branched, fine rhizoids. These rhizoids can bear intercalary cells, which many be once or twice septate (and what Schroeter saw as evidence of sexual reproduction). The endobiotic thallus gives rise to large, thick-walled, dark-colored resting spores that take the shape of the host cell. It appears the resting spores are formed from the intercalary cells. These resting spores will over winter and germinate in the spring.

== Ecology ==
Many species of Physoderma infect marsh plants, and several are confined to the submerged portion of hosts. Infections are usually confined to the leaves and stems, or, less commonly, the petioles of the host plants; however, there are some species that also or specifically infect parts of the flower. A notable example is Physoderma deformans; it infects the flower of two species of Anemone. A curious side effect, flowers infected with P. deformans live longer than non-infected flowers. There is at least one known species that infects the roots of the host plant rather than the above-ground parts. Infections can cause discoloration, warts, or galls. Physoderma species can be highly specific in both host choice and area of infection. An example is P. dulichii, which only infects the upper epidermal cells on young leaves of Dulichium arundinaceum. Another example are two species that infect Sium suave: one infects only the submerged portion of the plant, the other only infects the emergent portion of the plant, but they can be found growing on the same plant. Due to their reliance on zoospores, Physoderma species require free water. As an example, P. dulichii requires at least an inch of standing water to initiate the infection of a host plant. Once the plant is infected, however, high humidity, dew, or rain is sufficient to keep the infection going through the growing season.

== Species ==
- Physoderma aeschynomenes
- Physoderma alfalfae
- Physoderma alpinum
- Physoderma aneilematis
- Physoderma aponogetonicola
- Physoderma aponogetonis
- Physoderma asphodeli
- Physoderma astomatis
- Physoderma australasicum
- Physoderma beckmanniae
- Physoderma bohemicum
- Physoderma bothriochloae
- Physoderma brachiariae
- Physoderma brachiariae-eruciformis
- Physoderma chrysopogonicola
- Physoderma citri
- Physoderma claytoniana
- Physoderma claytonianum
- Physoderma comari
- Physoderma commelinae
- Physoderma corchori
- Physoderma crepidis
- Physoderma cynodontis
- Physoderma debeauxii
- Physoderma dichanthiicola
- Physoderma dicksonii
- Physoderma digitariae
- Physoderma dulichii
- Physoderma echinochloae
- Physoderma eleocharidis
- Physoderma eragrostidis
- Physoderma eriochloae
- Physoderma fabae
- Physoderma gerhardtii
- Physoderma graminis
- Physoderma hemisphaericum
- Physoderma hydrocotylidis
- Physoderma indicum
- Physoderma johnsii
- Physoderma kriegeriana
- Physoderma kyllingae
- Physoderma lathyri
- Physoderma leproides
- Physoderma limnanthemi
- Physoderma lycopi
- Physoderma maculare
- Physoderma marsileae
- Physoderma maydis
- Physoderma meliloti
- Physoderma menyanthis
- Physoderma mouretii
- Physoderma myriophylli
- Physoderma narasimhanii
- Physoderma negeri
- Physoderma nelumbii
- Physoderma notosciadii
- Physoderma ornithogali
- Physoderma palustre
- Physoderma pancratii
- Physoderma paspali
- Physoderma paspalidii
- Physoderma pluriannulatum
- Physoderma potteri
- Physoderma pulposum
- Physoderma rayssiae
- Physoderma ruebsaamenii
- Physoderma schroeteri
- Physoderma scirpicola
- Physoderma setariicola
- Physoderma sparrovii
- Physoderma thirumalacharii
- Physoderma trachoniticum
- Physoderma trifolii
- Physoderma vagabundum
- Physoderma vagans
