= John Nathaniel Couch =

American mycologist

John Nathaniel Couch (12 October 1896 – 16 December 1986) was an American mycologist. He was born in Prince Edward County, Virginia. He was a professor at the Department of Botany at the University of North Carolina at Chapel Hill for over six decades. He was elected to the US National Academy of Sciences in 1943.
