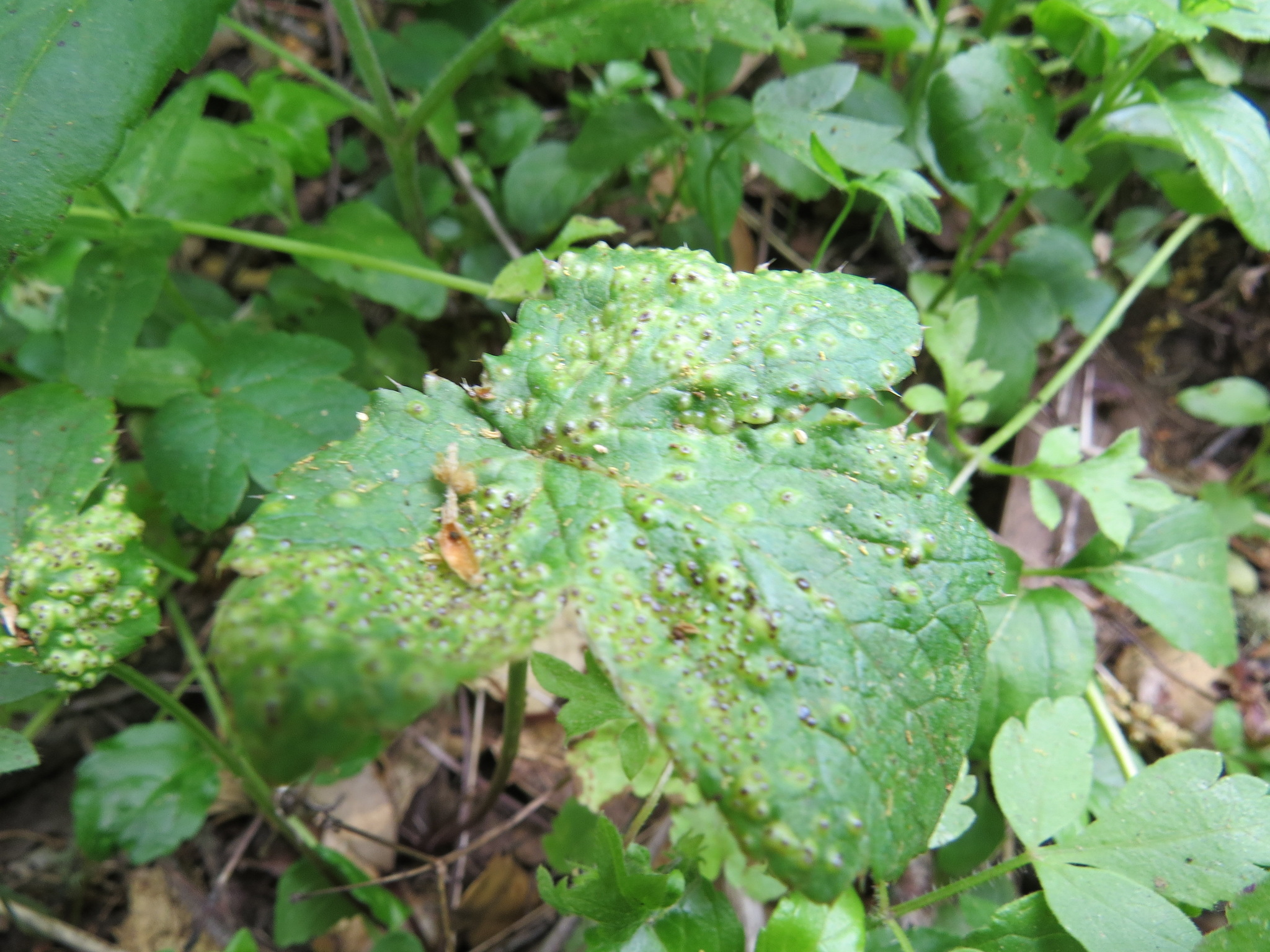
- Physoderma pluriannulatum

Scientific classification
- Domain: Eukaryota
- Kingdom: Fungi
- Division: Blastocladiomycota
- Class: Physodermatomycetes; Tedersoo et al.
- Order: Physodermatales; Cavalier-Smith
- Family: Physodermataceae; Sparrow

= Physodermataceae =

Family of fungi

Physodermatacae is a family of chytrid fungi in the order Physodermatales. Species in the family have a parasitic relationship with the host's physoderma. This family is distinctive in that it contains a thick wall around the sporangia to resist against unfavorable conditions. Sporangia releases from a host plant when rotting, dispersal is carried through the air. This family is not to be confused or related to basidiomycetes rusts and smut fungi. This parasite is distributed all across the world in aquatic, semi aquatic wetlands and in some ferns.

Physodermatacae breaks into two distinguished clades: Physoderma and Urophlyctis, which are grouped together because of the similar algal parasite called Paraphysoderma.
