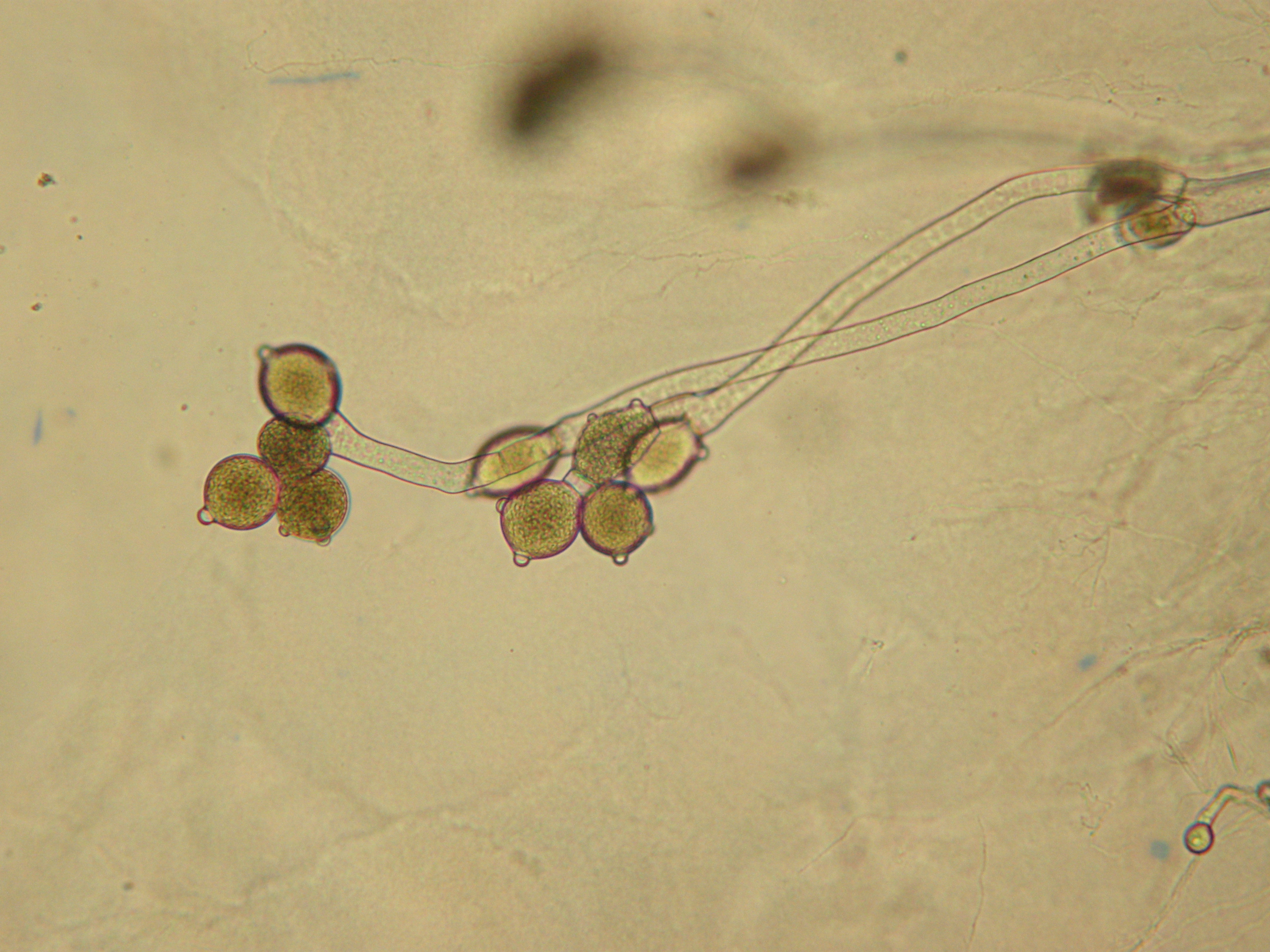
- Zoosporangia of an Allomyces sp. sporophyte growing on agar.

Scientific classification
- Kingdom: Fungi
- Division: Blastocladiomycota
- Class: Blastocladiomycetes
- Order: Blastocladiales
- Family: Blastocladiaceae; Petersen (1909)

Type genus
- Blastocladia Reinsch (1877)

Genera
- Allomyces; Blastocladiella; Blastocladia; Blastocladiopsis; Microallomyces

= Blastocladiaceae =

Family of fungi

The Blastocladiaceae are a family of fungi in the division Blastocladiomycota. It contains the following genera:

- Allomyces
- Blastocladiella
- Blastocladia
- Blastocladiopsis
- Microallomyces

The family was circumscribed by Henning Eiler Petersen in 1909.
