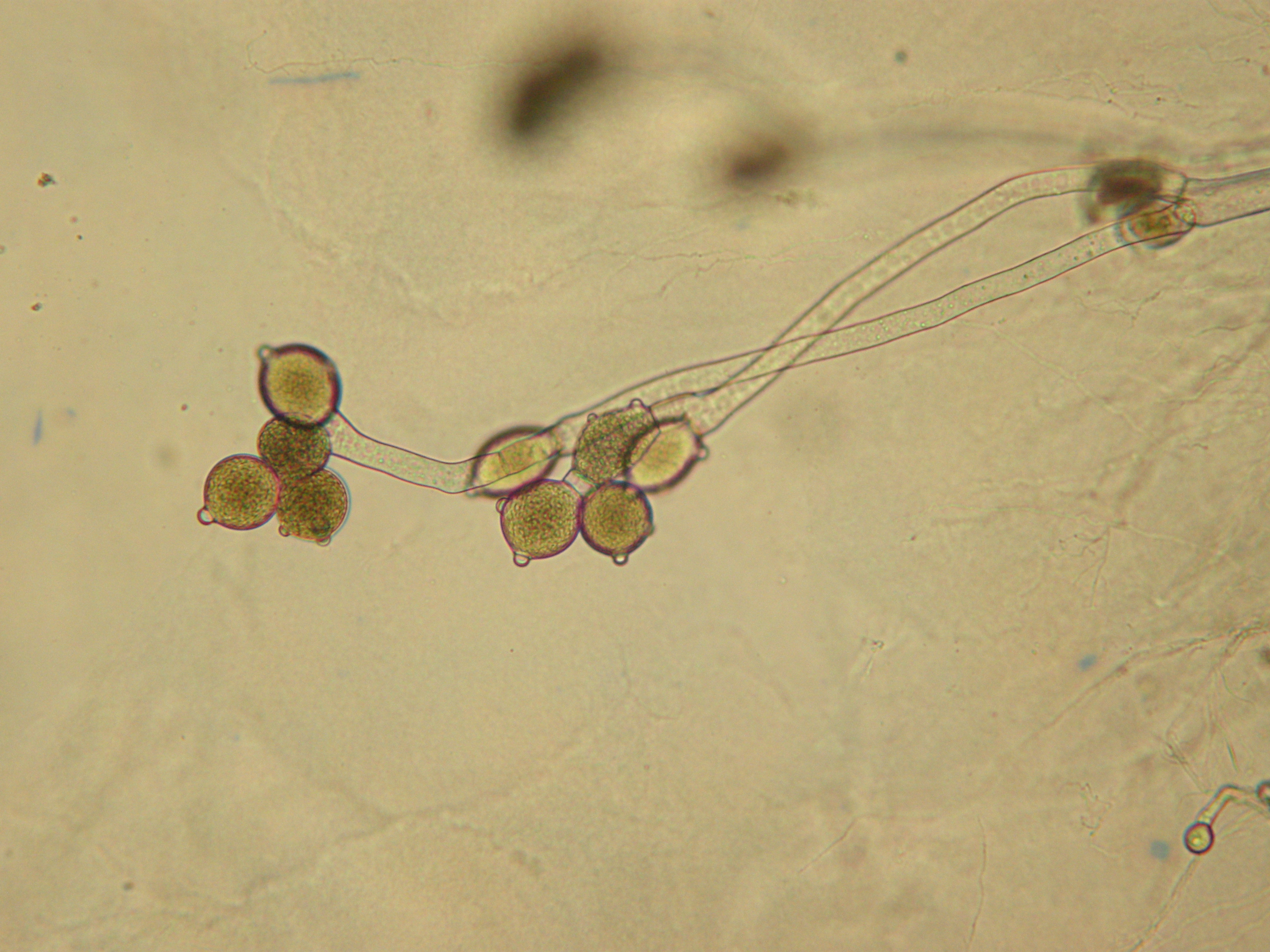
- Zoosporangia of an Allomyces sp. sporophyte growing on agar

Scientific classification
- Kingdom: Fungi
- Subkingdom: Blastocladiomyceta
- Division: Blastocladiomycota; T.Y.James (2006)

Classes and orders
- Physodermatomycetes; Physodermatales; Blastocladiomycetes; Blastocladiales

= Blastocladiomycota =

Phylum of flagellated fungi

Blastocladiomycota is part of a group of saprotrophic fungus that is one of the currently recognized phyla within the kingdom Fungi. Blastocladiomycota was originally the order Blastocladiales within the phylum Chytridiomycota until molecular and zoospore ultrastructural characters were used to demonstrate it was not monophyletic with Chytridiomycota. The order was first erected by Petersen for a single genus, Blastocladia, which was originally considered a member of the oomycetes. Accordingly, members of Blastocladiomycota are often referred to colloquially as "chytrids." However, some feel "chytrid" should refer only to members of Chytridiomycota. Thus, members of Blastocladiomycota are commonly called "blastoclads" by mycologists. Alternatively, members of Blastocladiomycota, Chytridiomycota, and Neocallimastigomycota lumped together as the zoosporic true fungi. Blastocladiomycota contains 5 families and approximately 12 genera. This early diverging branch of kingdom Fungi is the first to exhibit alternation of generations. As well, two (once) popular model organisms—Allomyces macrogynus and Blastocladiella emersonii—belong to this phylum.

== Morphology ==
Morphology in Blastocladiomycota varies greatly. For example, members of Coelomycetaceae are simple, unwalled, and plasmodial in nature. Some species in Blastocladia are monocentric, like the chytrids, while others are polycentric. The most remarkable are those members, such as Allomyces that demonstrate determinant, differentiated growth.

== Life cycle ==
=== Sexual reproduction ===
As stated above, some members of Blastocladiomycota exhibit alternation of generations. Members of this phylum also exhibit a form of sexual reproduction known as anisogamy. Anisogamy is the fusion of two sexual gametes that differ in morphology, usually size. In Allomyces, the thallus (body) is attached by rhizoids, and has an erect trunk on which reproductive organs are formed at the end of branches. During the haploid phase, the thallus forms male and female gametangia that release flagellated gametes. Gametes attract one another using pheromones and eventually fuse to form a zygote. The germinated zygote produces a diploid thallus with two types of sporangia: thin-walled zoosporangia and thick walled resting spores (or sporangia). The thin walled sporangia release diploid zoospores. The resting spore serves as a means of enduring unfavorable conditions. When conditions are favorable again, meiosis occurs and haploid zoospores are released. These germinate and grow into haploid thalli that will produce “male” and “female” gametangia and gametes.

=== Asexual reproduction ===
Similar to Chytridiomycota, members of Blastocladiomycota produce asexual zoospores to colonize new substrates. In some species, a curious phenomenon has been observed in the asexual zoospores. From time to time, asexual zoospores will pair up and exchange cytoplasm but not nuclei.

== Ecological roles ==
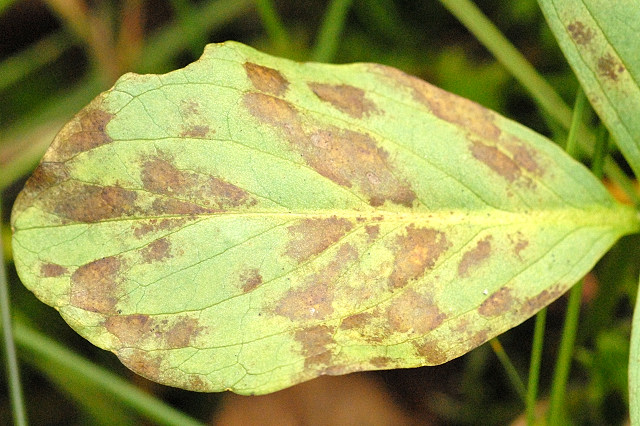
Plant leaf with Physoderma menyanthis (former Cladochytrium menyanthis) signs

Similar to Chytridiomycota, members of Blastocladiomycota are capable of growing on refractory materials, such as pollen, keratin, cellulose, and chitin. The best known species, however, are the parasites. Members of Catenaria are parasites of nematodes, midges, crustaceans, and even another blastoclad, Coelomyces. Members of the genus Physoderma and Urophlyctis are obligate plant parasites. Of economic importance is Physoderma maydis, a parasite of maize and the causal agent of brown spot disease. Also of importance are the species of Urophlyctis that parasitize alfalfa. However, ecologically, Physoderma are important parasites of many aquatic and marsh angiosperms. Also of human interest, for health reasons, are members of Coelomomyces, an unusual parasite of mosquitoes that requires an alternate crustacean host (the same one parasitized by members of Catenaria) to complete its life cycle. Others that are ecologically interesting include a parasite of water bears and the zooplankter Daphnia.

== Taxonomy ==
Based on the work of Philippe Silar and "The Mycota: A Comprehensive Treatise on Fungi as Experimental Systems for Basic and Applied Research" and synonyms from "Part 1- Virae, Prokarya, Protists, Fungi".

- Phylum Blastocladiomycota Tehler, 1988 ex James 2006 [Allomycota Cavalier-Smith 1981; Allomycotina Cavalier-Smith 1998]
  - Class Physodermatomycetes Tedersoo et al. 2018
    - Order Physodermatales Cavalier-Smith 2012 [Physodermatineae]
      - Family Physodermataceae [Urophlyctidaceae Schroeter 1886]
        - Genus Paraphysoderma Boussiba, Zarka & James 2011
        - Genus Physoderma Wallroth 1833 [Oedomyces Saccardo ex Trabut 1894]
        - Genus Urophlyctis Schröter 1886
  - Class Blastocladiomycetes James 2006 [Allomycetes Cavalier-Smith 1998]
    - Order Blastocladiales Petersen 1909 sensu Cavalier-Smith 2012 [Allomycales; Blastocladiineae]
      - Genus Endoblastidium Codreanu 1931
      - Genus Polycaryum Stempell 1901
      - Genus Nematoceromyces Doweld 2013
      - Genus Blastocladiella Matthews 1937 [Clavochytridium Couch & Cox 1939; Sphaerocladia Stüben 1939]
      - Family Coelomomycetaceae Couch 1962
        - Genus Callimastix Weissenberg 1912
        - Genus Coelomycidium Debaisieux 1919
        - Genus Coelomomyces Keilin 1921 [Zografia Bogayavlensky 1922]
      - Family Sorochytriaceae Dewel 1985
        - Genus Sorochytrium Dewel 1985
      - Family Catenariaceae Couch 1945
        - Genus Catenaria Sorokin 1889 non Roussel 1806 [Perirhiza Karling 1946]
        - Genus Catenophlyctis Karling 1965
      - Family Blastocladiaceae Petersen 1909
        - Genus Blastocladiopsis Sparrow 1950
        - Genus Microallomyces Emerson & Robertson 1974
        - Genus Blastocladia Reinsch 1877
        - Genus Allomyces Butler 1911 [Septocladia Coker & Grant 1922]
