= List of fungal orders =

This article lists the orders of the Fungi.

== Phylogeny ==
Phylogeny of Fungi.

- - Rozellomyceta
    - Rozellomycota
    - Microsporidiomycota
  - - Aphelidiomyceta
      Aphelidiomycota
    - Eumycota
      - Chytridiomyceta
        - Blastocladiomycota
        - - Neocallimastigomycota
          - - Monoblepharomycota
            - Chytridiomycota
      - - Zoopagomyceta
          - - Basidiobolomycota
            - Olpidiomycota
          - - Entomophthoromycota
            - Kickxellomycota
        - - Mucoromyceta
            - Glomeromycota
            - - Mortierellomycota
              - - Calcarisporiellomycota
                - Mucoromycota
          - Dikarya
            - - Entorrhizomycota
              - Basidiomycota
            - Ascomycota

== Subkingdom Rozellomyceta ==
=== Division Rozellomycota ===
==== Class Rozellomycetes ====
- Order Rozellida Li, Heath & Packer 1993

=== Division Microsporidiomycota ===
==== Class Chytridiopsidea ====
- Order Chytridiopsida Weiser 1974

==== Class Metchnikovellea ====
- Order Metchnikovellida Vivier 1977

==== Class Microsporidea ====
- Order Amblyosporida Tokarev & Issi 2020
- Order Glugeida Issi 1986
- Order Neopereziida Tokarev & Issi 2020
- Order Nosematida Labbé 1899
- Order Ovavesiculida Tokarev & Issi 2020

== Subkingdom Aphelidiomyceta ==
=== Division Aphelidiomycota ===
==== Class Aphelidiomycetes ====
- Order Aphelidiales Tedersoo et al. 2018

== Subkingdom Chytridiomyceta ==
=== Division Blastocladiomycota ===
==== Class Physodermatomycetes ====
- Order Physodermatales Cavalier-Smith 2012

==== Class Blastocladiomycetes ====
- Order Blastocladiales Petersen 1909
- Order Callimastigales Doweld 2014
- Order Catenomycetales Doweld 2014

=== Division Neocallimastigomycota ===
==== Class Neocallimastigomycetes ====
- Order Neocallimastigales Li, Heath & Packer 1993

=== Division Monoblepharomycota ===
Phylogeny of Monoblepharomycota

- - - Hyaloraphidiales
    - Sanchytriales
  - Monoblepharidales

==== Class Hyaloraphidiomycetes ====
- Order Hyaloraphidiales Doweld 2001

==== Class Sanchytriomycetes ====
- Order Sanchytriales Tedersoo et al. 2018

==== Class Monoblepharidomycetes ====
- Order Monoblepharidales Schröter 1883

=== Division Chytridiomycota ===
Phylogeny of Chytridiomycota

- - - Polyphagales
    - - Gromochytriales
      - Mesochytriales
  - - - Lobulomycetales
      - Synchytriales
    - - - Cladochytriales
        - Polychytriales
      - - - Spizellomycetales
          - Rhizophlyctidales
        - - Chytridiales
          - Rhizophydiales

==== Class Coenomycetes ====
- Order Coenomycetales Doweld 2014

==== Class Chytridiomycetes ====
- Order ?Nephridiophagales Doweld 2014
- Order ?Saccopodiales Doweld 2014
- Order ?Zygophlyctidales Seto 2019
- Order Chytridiales Cohn 1879
- Order Cladochytriales Mozley-Standridge 2009
- Order Gromochytriales Karpov & Aleoshin 2014
- Order Lobulomycetales Simmons 2009
- Order Mesochytriales Karpov & Aleoshin 2014
- Order Polyphagales Doweld 2014
- Order Polytrichiales Longcore & Simmons 2012
- Order Rhizophlyctidales Letcher 2007
- Order Rhizophydiales Letcher 2006
- Order Spizellomycetales Barr 1980
- Order Synchytriales Doweld 2014

== Subkingdom Zoopagomyceta ==
=== Division Caulochytriomycota ===
==== Class Caulochytriomycetes ====
- Order Caulochytriales Doweld 2014

=== Division Basidiobolomycota ===
==== Class Basidiobolomycetes ====
- Order Basidiobolales Jaczewski & Jaczewski 1931 ex. Cavalier-Smith 2012

=== Division Olpidiomycota ===
==== Class Olpidiomycetes ====
- Order Olpidiales Cavalier-Smith 2012

=== Division Entomophthoromycota ===
==== Class Neozygitomycetes ====
- Order Neozygitales Humber 2012

==== Class Entomophthoromycetes ====
- Order Entomophthorales Winter 1880

=== Division Kickxellomycota ===
Phylogeny of Kickxellomycota

- - Zoopagomycetes
    Zoopagales
  - Kickxellomycotina
    - Dimargaritomycetes
      Dimargaritales
    - - Ramicandelaberomycetes
        Ramicandelaberales
      - Kickxellomycetes
        - Barbatosporales
        - - Kickxellales
          - - Asellariales
            - Harpellales

==== Subdivision Zoopagomycotina ====
===== Class Zoopagomycetes =====
- Order Zoopagales Bessey 1950 ex. Benjamin 1979

==== Subdivision Kickxellomycotina ====
===== Kickxellomycotina incertae sedis =====
- Order Zygnemomycetales Doweld 2014

===== Class Dimargaritomycetes =====
- Order Dimargaritales Benjamin 1979

===== Class Ramicandelaberomycetes =====
- Order Ramicandelaberales Doweld 2014

===== Class Kickxellomycetes =====
- Order ?Orphellales Valle et al. 2018
- Order ?Spiromycetales Doweld 2014
- Order Barbatosporales Doweld 2014
- Order Kickxellales Kreisel 1969 ex. Benjamin 1979
- Subclass Trichomycetalia Cavalier-Smith 1998
  - Order Asellariales Manier 1950 ex. Manier & Lichtward 1978
  - Order Harpellales Lichtward & Manier 1978

== Subkingdom Mucoromyceta ==
=== Division Glomeromycota ===
Phylogeny of Glomeromycota

- - - Paraglomeromycetes
      Paraglomerales
    - Archaeosporomycetes
      Archaeosporales
  - Glomeromycetes
    - Glomerales
    - - Diversisporales
      - Gigasporales

==== Class Paraglomeromycetes ====
- Order Paraglomerales Walker & Schüssler 2001

==== Class Archaeosporomycetes ====
- Order Archaeosporales Walker & Schüssler 2001

==== Class Glomeromycetes ====
- Order Gigasporales Sieverd. et al. 2011
- Order Glomerales Morton & Benny 1990
- Order Diversisporales Walker & Schüssler 2004

=== Division Mortierellomycota ===
==== Class Mortierellomycetes ====
- Order Mortierellales Cavalier-Smith 1998

=== Division Calcarisporiellomycota ===
==== Class Calcarisporiellomycetes ====
- Order Calcarisporiellales Tedersoo et al. 2018

=== Division Mucoromycota ===
Phylogeny of Mucoromycota

- - Endogonomycetes
    Endogonales
  - Mucoromycetes
    - Bifiguratus
    - - Umbelopsidales
      - Mucorales

==== Class Endogonomycetes ====
- Order Endogonales Jacz. & P.A.Jacz.

==== Class Mucoromycetes ====
- Genus Bifiguratus Torres-Cruz & Porras-Alfaro 2017
- Order Umbelopsidales Spatafora, Stajich & Bonito 2016
- Order Mucorales Fries 1832

== Subkingdom Dikarya ==
=== Division Entorrhizomycota ===
==== Class Entorrhizomycetes ====
- Order Talbotiomycetales Riess et al. 2015
- Order Entorrhizales Bauer & Oberwinkler

=== Division Basidiomycota ===
Phylogeny of Basidiomycota

- - Pucciniomycotina
    - Pucciniomycetes
    - - - Cryptomycocolacomycetes
        - Classiculomycetes
        - Atractiellomycetes
      - - Cystobasidiomycetes
        - - Microbotryomycetes
          - - Mixiomycetes
            - - Tritirachiomycetes
              - - Agaricostilbomycetes
                - Spiculogloeomycetes
  - - - Wallemiomycotina
        Wallemiomycetes
      - Ustilaginomycotina
        - Exobasidiomycetes
        - - Malasseziomycetes
          - Ustilaginomycetes
    - Agaricomycotina
      - - Bartheletiomycetes
        - Tremellomycetes
      - - Dacrymycetes
        - Agaricomycetes

==== Subdivision Pucciniomycotina ====
===== Class Tritirachiomycetes =====
- Order Tritirachiales Aime & Schell 2011

===== Class Mixiomycetes =====
- Order Mixiales Bauer et al. 2006

===== Class Spiculogloeomycetes =====
- Order Spiculogloeales Bauer et al. 2006

===== Class Agaricostilbomycetes =====
- Order Agaricostilbales Oberwinkler & Bauer 1989

===== Class Cystobasidiomycetes =====
- Order Buckleyzymales Zhao & Hyde 2017
- Order Sakaguchiales Zhao & Hyde 2017
- Order Naohideales Bauer et al.
- Order Cyphobasidiales Spribille & Mayrhofer 2016
- Order Cystobasidiales Bauer et al.
- Order Erythrobasidiales Bauer et al.

===== Class Microbotryomycetes =====
- Order Heitmaniales Wang & Bai 2020
- Order Rosettozymales Wang & Bai 2020
- Order Heterogastridiales Oberwinkler & Bauer 1990
- Order Sporidiobolales Sampaio, Weiss & Bauer 2003
- Order Curvibasidiales Doweld 2014
- Order Leucosporidiales Sampaio, Weiss & Bauer 2003
- Order Kriegeriales Toome & Aime 2013
- Order Microbotryales Bauer & Oberwinkler 1997

===== Class Classiculomycetes =====
- Order Classiculales Bauer et al. 2003

===== Class Cryptomycocolacomycetes =====
- Order Cryptomycocolacales Oberwinkler & Bauer 1990

===== Class Atractiellomycetes =====
- Order Atractiellales Oberwinkler & Bandoni 1982

===== Class Pucciniomycetes =====
Phylogeny of Pucciniomycetes

- - Platygloeales
  - - - Pachnocybales
      - Septobasidiales
    - - Helicobasidiales
      - Pucciniales

- Order Septobasidiales Couch 1938 ex Donk 1964
- Order Helicobasidiales Bauer et al.
- Order Pachnocybales Bauer et al.
- Order Platygloeales Moore 1900
- Order Pucciniales Clements & Shear 1931

==== Subdivision Wallemiomycotina ====
===== Class Wallemiomycetes =====
- Order Geminibasidiales Nguyen, Nickerson & Seifert 2013
- Order Wallemiomycetales Zalar, de Hoog & Schroers 2005

==== Subdivision Ustilaginomycotina ====
===== Class Malasseziomycetes =====
- Order Malasseziales Moore 1980 emend. Begerow, Bauer & Boekhout 2000

===== Class Exobasidiomycetes =====
- Subclass Tilletiomycetidae
  - Order Tilletiales Kreisel ex Bauer & Oberwinkler 1997
  - Order Moniliellales Wang, Bai & Boekhout 2014
  - Order Georgefischeriales Bauer, Begerow & Oberwinkler 1997
- Subclass Exobasidiomycetidae
  - Order Golubeviales Wang et al. 2015
  - Order Robbauerales Wang et al. 2015
  - Order Microstromatales Bauer & Oberwinkler 1997
  - Order Doassansiales Bauer & Oberwinkler 1997
  - Order Ceraceosorales Begerow, Stoll & Bauer 2006
  - Order Entylomatales Bauer & Oberwinkler 1997
  - Order Exobasidiales Henssen 1898 em. Bauer & Oberwinkler

===== Class Ustilaginomycetes =====
- Order Cintractiellales McTaggart & Shivas 2020
- Order Uleiellales Garnica et al. 2016
- Order Violaceomycetales Albu, Toome & Aime 2015
- Order Urocystales Bauer & Oberwinkler 1997
- Order Ustilaginales Beketov 1864 em. Bauer & Oberwinkler

==== Subdivision Agaricomycotina ====
===== Class Bartheletiomycetes =====
- Order Bartheletiales Thines 2017

===== Class Tremellomycetes =====
- Order Cystofilobasidiales Fell, Roeijmans & Boekhout 1999
- Order Filobasidiales Jülich 1981
- Order Holtermanniales Libkind et al. 2010
- Order Trichosporonales Boekhout & Fell 2001
- Order Tremellales Fries 1821

===== Class Dacrymycetes =====
- Order Dacrymycetales Tokum. & Oberwinkler 2013
- Order Dacrymycetales Henn. 1897

===== Class Agaricomycetes =====
- Subclass Cantharellomycetidae Hibbett 2005
  - Order Cantharellales Gäumann 1936
- Order Sebacinales Weiss et al. 2004
- Subclass Auriculariomycetidae Jülich 1981
  - Order Trechisporales Larsson 2007
  - Order Auriculariales Schröter 1897
- Subclass Hymenochaetomycetidae Vizzini 2004
  - Order Hymenochaetales Oberwinkler 1977
- Subclass Thelephoromycetidae Locquin 1984
  - Order Corticiales Larsson 2007
  - Order Russulales Kreisel 1969 ex Kirk, Cannon & David 2001
  - Order Thelephorales Corner ex Oberwinkler 1976
  - Order Polyporales Gäumann 1926
- Subclass Phallomycetidae Hosaka, Castellano & Spatafora 2007
  - Order Gloeophyllales Thorn 2007
  - Order Stereopsidales Sjkvistet al. 2014
  - Order Geastrales Hosaka & Castellano 2006
  - Order Gomphales Jülich 1981
  - Order Hysterangiales
  - Order Phallales E. Fisch. 1898
- Subclass Agaricomycetidae Locquin 1984 ex Parmasto 1986
  - Order Lepidostromatales Hodkinson & Lücking 2014
  - Order Tremellodendropsidales Vizzini 2014
  - Order Jaapiales Manfr. Binder, Larsson & Hibbett 2010
  - Order Boletales Gilbert 1931
  - Order Atheliales Jülich 1981
  - Order Amylocorticiales Larsson, Manfr. Binder & Hibbett 2010
  - Order Agaricales Underwood 1899

=== Division Ascomycota ===
Phylogeny of Ascomycota

- - Taphrinomycotina
    - Neolectomycetes
    - - Archaeorhizomycetes
      - - - Pneumocystidomycetes
          - Schizosaccharomycetes
        - Taphrinomycetes
  - - Saccharomycotina
      Saccharomycetes
    - Pezizomycotina
      - - Orbiliomycetes
        - Pezizomycetes
      - - Geoglossomycetes
        - - - Laboulbeniomycetes
            - - Leotiomycetes
              - Sordariomycetes
          - - - - Candelariomycetes
                - - Coniocybomycetes
                  - Lichinomycetes
              - - Xylonomycetes
                - - Xylobotryomycetes
                  - Lecanoromycetes
            - - Eurotiomycetes
              - - Arthoniomycetes
                - Dothideomycetes

==== Subdivision Taphrinomycotina ====
===== Class Archaeorhizomycetes =====
- Order Archaeorhizomycetales Rosling & James 2011

===== Class Neolectomycetes =====
- Order Neolectales Landvik et al. 1993

===== Class Pneumocystidomycetes =====
- Order Pneumocystidales Eriksson 1994

===== Class Schizosaccharomycetes =====
- Order Schizosaccharomycetales Eriksson & Winka 1997

===== Class Taphrinomycetes =====
- Order Taphrinales Gaum. & Dodge 1928

==== Subdivision Saccharomycotina ====
===== Class Saccharomycetes =====
- Order Saccharomycetales Kudrjanzev 1960

==== Subdivision Pezizomycotina ====
===== Pezizomycotina incertae sedis =====
- Order Thelocarpales Lücking & Lumbsch 2016
- Order Vezdaeales Lücking & Lumbsch 2016

===== Class Sareomycetes =====
- Order Sareales Beimforde et al. 2020

===== Class Pezizomycetes =====
- Order Pezizales Schröter 1894
- Family Caloscyphaceae Harmaja 2002
- Order Tuberales Dumortier 1829 ex Winter 1884
- Order Pyronematales

===== Class Orbiliomycetes =====
- Order Orbiliales Baral et al. 2003

===== Class Geoglossomycetes =====
- Order Geoglossales Wang, Schoch & Spatafora 2009

===== Class Candelariomycetes =====
- Order Candelariales

===== Class Coniocybomycetes =====
- Order Coniocybales

===== Class Lichinomycetes =====
- Order Lichinales

===== Class Lecanoromycetes =====
  - Order Micropeltidales
  - Order Turquoiseomycetales
- Subclass Acarosporomycetidae
  - Order Acarosporales
- Subclass Ostropomycetidae
  - Order Thelenellales
  - Order Schaereriales
  - Order Sarrameanales
  - Order Pertusariales [Agyriales]
  - Order Baeomycetales
  - Order Ostropales
  - Order Gyalectales (Trichotheliales)
  - Order Graphidales
- Subclass Umbilicariomycetidae
  - Order Umbilicariales
- Subclass Lecanoromycetidae
  - Order Sporastatiales
  - Order Rhizocarpales
  - Order Lecideales
  - Order Peltigerales
  - Order Caliciales
  - Order Leprocaulales
  - Order Teloschistales
  - Order Lecanorales

===== Class Arthoniomycetes =====
- Order Lichenostigmatales
- Order Arthoniales

===== Class Dothideomycetes =====
- Order Abrothallales
- Order Asterinales
- Order Aulographales
- Order Catinellales
- Order Cladoriellales
- Order Collemopsidiales
- Order Coniosporiales
- Order Dyfrolomycetales
- Order Eremithallales
- Order Eremomycetales
- Order Jahnulales
- Order Kirschsteiniotheliales
- Order Lembosinales
- Order Lichenotheliales
- Order Lineolatales
- Order Microthyriales
- Order Murramarangomycetales
- Order Parmulariales
- Subclass Dothideomycetidae
  - Order Myriangiales
  - Order Dothideales
  - Order Capnodiales
- Subclass Pleosporomycetidae
  - Order Acrospermales
  - Order Botryosphaeriales
  - Order Dyfrolomycetales
  - Order Gloniales
  - Order Hysteriales
  - Order Minutisphaerales
  - Order Monoblastiales
  - Order Muyocopronales
  - Order Mytilinidiales
  - Order Natipusillales
  - Order Patellariales
  - Order Phaeotrichales
  - Order Pleosporales
  - Order Stigmatodiscales
  - Order Strigulales
  - Order Superstratomycetales
  - Order Trypetheliales
  - Order Tubeufiales
  - Order Valsariales
  - Order Venturiales
  - Order Zeloasperisporiales

===== Class Xylobotryomycetes =====
- Order Xylobotryales

===== Class Eurotiomycetes =====
- Subclass Mycocaliciomycetidae
  - Order Mycocaliciales
- Subclass Sclerococcomycetidae
  - Order Sclerococcales
- Subclass Chaetothyriomycetidae
  - Order Pyrenulales
  - Order Phaeomoniellales
  - Order Verrucariales
  - Order Chaetothyriales
- Subclass Eurotiomycetidae
  - Order Coryneliales
  - Order Eurotiales
  - Order Arachnomycetales
  - Order Onygenales

===== Class Xylonomycetes =====
- Order Symbiotaphrinales
- Order Xylonales

===== Class Leotiomycetes =====
- Order Lahmiales
- Order Lauriomycetales
- Order Lichinodiales
- Order Marthamycetales
- Order Micraspidales
- Order Leotiales
- Order Phacidiales
- Order Rhytismatales
- Order Medeolariales
- Order Cyttariales
- Order Chaetomellales
- Order Thelebolales
- Order Helotiales

===== Class Laboulbeniomycetes =====
- Order Herpomycetales
- Order Laboulbeniales
- Order Pyxidiophorales

===== Class Sordariomycetes =====
- Order ?Amplistromatales
- Order ?Catabotryales
- Order ?Spathulosporales
- Order ?Tracyllalales
- Order ?Vermiculariopsiellales
- Subclass Diaporthomycetidae
  - Order Annulatascales
  - Order Atractosporales
  - Order Calosphaeriales
  - Order Diaporthales
  - Order Distoseptisporales
  - Order Jobellisiales
  - Order Magnaporthales
  - Order Myrmecridiales
  - Order Ophiostomatales
  - Order Pararamichloridiales
  - Order Phomatosporales
  - Order Sporidesmiales
  - Order Tirisporellales
  - Order Togniniales
  - Order Xenospadicoidales
- Subclass Hypocreomycetidae
  - Order Cancellidiales
  - Order Coronophorales (Melanosporales)
  - Order Falcocladiales
  - Order Glomerellales
  - Order Hypocreales
  - Order Microascales [Halosphaeriales]
  - Order Parasympodiellales
  - Order Torpedosporales
- Subclass Lulworthiomycetidae
  - Order Koralionastetales
  - Order Lulworthiales
- Subclass Pisorisporiomycetidae
  - Order Pisorisporiales
- Subclass Savoryellomycetidae
  - Order Conioscyphales
  - Order Fuscosporellales
  - Order Pleurotheciales
  - Order Savoryellales
- Subclass Sordariomycetidae
  - Order Boliniales
  - Order Cephalothecales
  - Order Chaetosphaeriales
  - Order Coniochaetales
  - Order Meliolales
  - Order Phyllachorales
  - Order Pseudodactylariales
  - Order Sordariales
  - Order Trichosphaeriales
- Subclass Xylariomycetidae
  - Order Amphisphaeriales
  - Order Delonicicolales
  - Order Xylariales
