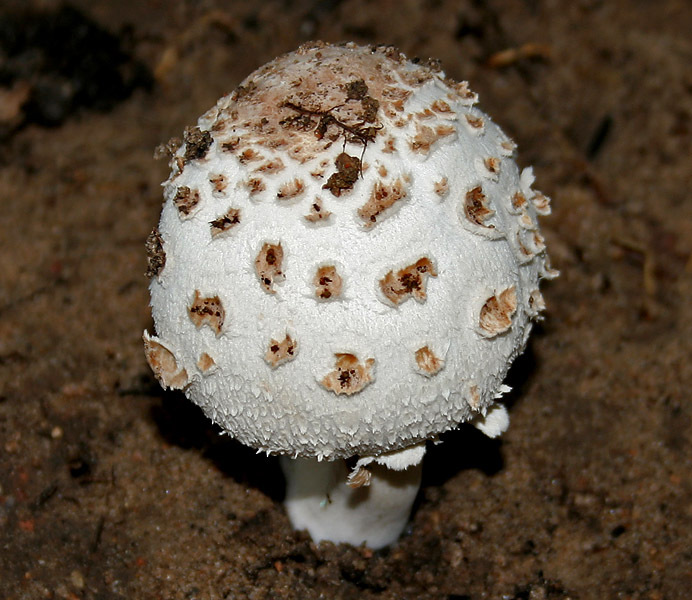
- Macrolepiota procera (Agaricales)
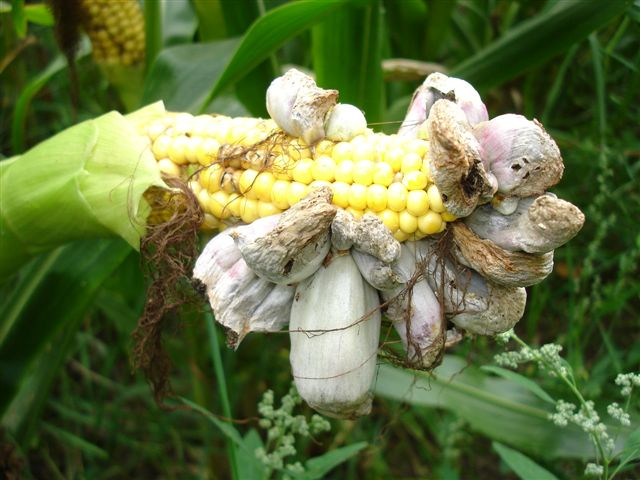
- Ustilago maydis

Scientific classification
- Kingdom: Fungi
- Division: Basidiomycota
- (unranked): Orthomycotina

Subdivisions and classes
- Agaricomycotina Ustilaginomycotina

= Orthomycotina =

Clade of fungi

Orthomycotina is a clade of fungi containing Agaricomycotina and Ustilaginomycotina, or all Basidiomycete fungi except Pucciniomycotina according to the 2007 fungal phylogeny "The Mycota: A Comprehensive Treatise on Fungi as Experimental Systems for Basic and Applied Research" and Tedersoo et al. 2018.

- Basidiomycota
  - Pucciniomycotina
    - - Tritirachiomycetes
      - - Mixiomycetes
        - Agaricostilbomycetes
    - - Cystobasidiomycetes
      - - - Classiculaceae
          - Microbotryomycetes
        - - Cryptomycocolacomycetes
          - - Atractiellomycetes
            - Pucciniomycetes
  - Orthomycotina
    - Ustilaginomycotina
      - - Monilielliomycetes
        - Malasseziomycetes
      - - Ustilaginomycetes
        - Exobasidiomycetes
    - Agaricomycotina
      - ?Geminibasidiomycetes
      - ?Wallemiomycetes
      - Bartheletiomycetes
      - - Tremellomycetes
        - - Dacrymycetes
          - Agaricomycetes

== See also ==
- Basidiomycota
