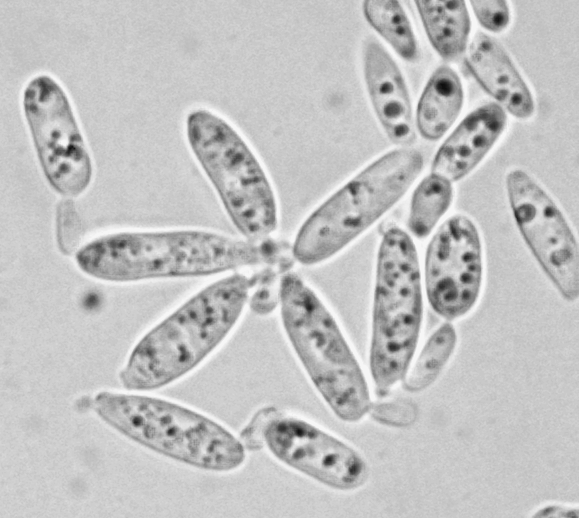
- Rosette-like cell clusters formed by Meredithblackwellia eburnea

Scientific classification
- Kingdom: Fungi
- Division: Basidiomycota
- Class: Microbotryomycetes
- Order: Kriegeriales
- Family: Kriegeriaceae; Toome & Aime (2013)

Genera
- Kriegeria; Meredithblackwellia; Phenoliferia; Yamadamyces

= Kriegeriaceae =

Family of fungi

The Kriegeriaceae are a family of fungi in the subdivision Pucciniomycotina. The family currently comprises four genera, one of which (Kriegeria) contains a plant pathogenic species with auricularioid (laterally septate) basidia. The other genera contain species currently known only from their yeast states.
