= Leucosporidium =

Scientific classification
- Domain: Eukaryota
- Kingdom: Fungi
- Division: Basidiomycota
- Class: Microbotryomycetes
- Order: Leucosporidiales
- Family: Leucosporidiaceae
- Genus: Leucosporidium; Fell, Statzell, I.L. Hunter & Phaff (1970)

Type species
- Leucosporidium scottii Fell, Statzell, I.L. Hunter & Phaff (1970)

Species
- Leucosporidium creatinivorum Leucosporidium drummii Leucosporidium egoroviorum Leucosporidium escuderoi Leucosporidium fellii Leucosporidium fragarium Leucosporidium golubevii Leucosporidium himalayense Leucosporidium intermedium Leucosporidium krtinense Leucosporidium muscorum Leucosporidium scottii Leucosporidium yakuticum

Synonyms
- Leucosporidiella Samp. (2003); Mastigobasidium Golubev (1999)

Genus of fungi

Leucosporidium is a genus of fungi in the subdivision Pucciniomycotina. The genus comprises fungi that are mostly known from their yeast states, though some produce hyphal states in culture that give rise to teliospores from which auricularioid (laterally septate) basidia emerge. Species known only from their anamorphic yeast states were formerly referred to the genus Leucosporidiella, but, following changes to the International Code of Nomenclature for algae, fungi, and plants, the practice of giving different names to teleomorph and anamorph forms of the same fungus was discontinued, meaning that Leucosporidiella became a synonym of the earlier name Leucosporidium. Species have been isolated predominantly from cold environments and are regarded as psychrotolerant.
