= Kriegeria =

Scientific classification
- Kingdom: Fungi
- Division: Basidiomycota
- Class: Microbotryomycetes
- Order: Kriegeriales
- Family: Kriegeriaceae
- Genus: Kriegeria; Bres. (1891)

Type species
- Kriegeria eriophori Bres. (1891)

Synonyms
- Xenogloea Syd. & P. Syd. (1919) nom. illegit. Zymoxenogloea D.J. McLaughlin & Doublés (1992)

Genus of fungi

Kriegeria is a genus of fungi in the subdivision Pucciniomycotina. The genus is currently monotypic, containing the single species Kriegeria eriophori. The species is a plant pathogen, parasitic on sedges, and produces auricularioid (laterally septate) basidia and basidiospores that germinate to form a yeast state.

== Taxonomy ==
Both the genus and the species were described in 1891 by Italian mycologist Giacomo Bresadola, based on a specimen collected in Saxony by German mycologist Karl Wilhelm Krieger. Rabenhorst had proposed the name Kriegeria previously for an ascomycetous fungus, leading to the creation of the replacement genus Xenogloea for Bresadola's species. Rabenhorst's Kriegeria was, however, invalidly published and Bresadola's Kriegeria is the legitimate name, with the later Xenogloea as an illegitimate synonym. The anamorphic yeast state was given the name Zymoxenogloea eriophori, but, following changes to the International Code of Nomenclature for algae, fungi, and plants, the practice of giving different names to teleomorph and anamorph forms of the same fungus was discontinued, meaning that Zymoxenogloea became a synonym of the earlier name Kriegeria.

Molecular research, based on cladistic analysis of DNA sequences, has shown that Kriegeria is a monophyletic (natural) genus.

== Description ==
The fungus grows within the host leaves, producing hyphae with clamp connections. Basidia emerge through the leaf's stoma in a gelatinous matrix and are auricularioid (tubular and laterally septate), forming a weakly pustular, yellowish basidiocarp on the undersurface of the leaf. The basidiospores are smooth, hyaline, and fusoid-cylindrical, measuring 18-30 x 7-11 μm. They germinate by budding off yeast cells.

== Habitat and distribution ==
The species was originally found on Eriophorum angustifolium (cottongrass) in Europe, but has also been found on Scirpus sylvaticus (wood clubrush) and, in North America, Scirpus atrovirens (dark-green bulrush). In Europe, Kriegeria eriophori has been recorded from Germany and the Czech Republic; in North America, from Canada and the USA. It appears to be rare or rarely recorded.
