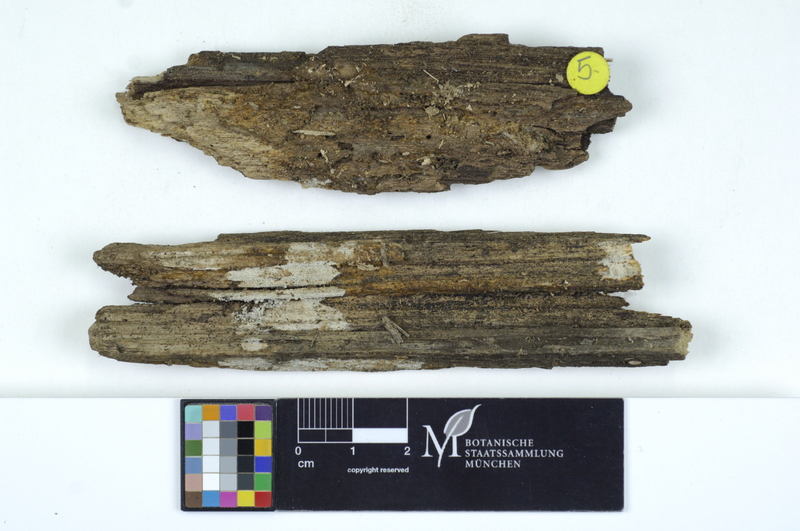

Scientific classification
- Kingdom: Fungi
- Division: Basidiomycota
- Class: Microbotryomycetes
- Family: Colacogloeaceae
- Genus: Colacogloea
- Species: C. peniophorae

Binomial name
- Colacogloea peniophorae (Bourdot & Galzin) Oberw., R. Bauer & Bandoni

= Colacogloea peniophorae =

Species of fungus

Colacogloea peniophorae is a species of fungus in the family Colacogloeaceae, first described by Bourdot & Galzin and given its current name by Franz Oberwinkler, Robert Bauer and Robert Joseph Bandoni.

== Distribution and habitat ==
It appears in North America, Europe and Asia, most often in Europe. It usually grows on Hyphoderma fruiting bodies.
