= Camptobasidiaceae =

Scientific classification
- Kingdom: Fungi
- Division: Basidiomycota
- Class: Microbotryomycetes
- Order: Kriegeriales
- Family: Camptobasidiaceae; R.T. Moore (1996)

Genera
- Camptobasidium; Glaciozyma

Family of fungi

The Camptobasidiaceae are a family of fungi in the subdivision Pucciniomycotina. The family currently comprises two genera, one of which (Camptobasidium) contains an aquatic, hyphal species with auricularioid (laterally septate) basidia. The other genus contains species currently known only from their yeast states.
