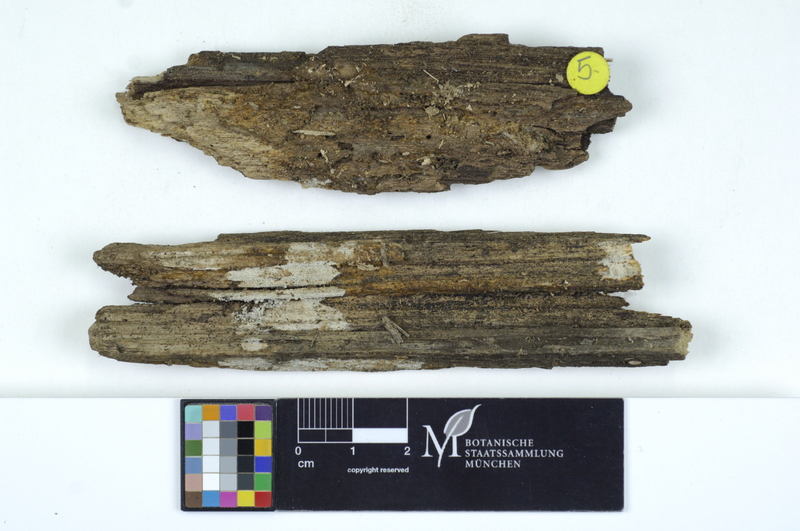
- Colacogloea peniophorae

Scientific classification
- Domain: Eukaryota
- Kingdom: Fungi
- Division: Basidiomycota
- Class: Microbotryomycetes
- Family: Colacogloeaceae
- Genus: Colacogloea; Oberw. & Bandoni (1991)

Type species
- Colacogloea peniophorae (Bourdot & Galzin) Oberw., R. Bauer & Bandoni (1991)

= Colacogloea =

Genus of fungi

Colacogloea is a genus of fungi belonging to the class Microbotryomycetes. Most species in the genus are known only from their yeast states. Where known, basidiocarps (fruit bodies) have auricularioid (laterally septate) basidia and occur as parasites on or in the fruit bodies of other fungi.

== Taxonomy ==
The genus was proposed in 1991 by mycologists Franz Oberwinkler and Robert Bandoni to accommodate a species previously referred to the genus Platygloea but not related to Platygloea disciformis, the type of that genus. Unlike P. disciformis, Colacogloea peniophorae (now Colacogloea effusa) produces a yeast state and is parasitic on corticioid fungi, interacting with host hyphae through vesicular bodies called colacosomes. Additional species having yeast states and colacosomes have subsequently been transferred to the genus.

Molecular research, based on cladistic analysis of DNA sequences, has confirmed that Colacogloea is monophyletic (a natural group). It has also shown that a number of yeast species, some of which were previously referred to the genus Rhodotorula, belong in Colacogloea.

== Species ==
- Colacogloea aletridis Q.M. Wang, F.Y. Bai & A.H. Li
- Colacogloea allantospora Ginns & Bandoni
- Colacogloea armeniacae Q.M. Wang, G.S. Wang, Wangmu & Y. Sun
- Colacogloea bispora (Hauerslev) Oberw. & R. Bauer
- Colacogloea cycloclastica (Thanh, M.S. Smit, Moleleki & Fell) Q.M. Wang, F.Y. Bai, M. Groenew. & Boekhout
- Colacogloea demeterae Yurkov, A.M. Schäfer & Begerow
- Colacogloea diffluens (Ruinen) Q.M. Wang, F.Y. Bai, M. Groenew. & Boekhout
- Colacogloea effusa (J. Schröt.) Malysheva, Schoutteten & Spirin
- Colacogloea eucalyptica (C.H. Pohl, M.S. Smit & Albertyn) Q.M. Wang, F.Y. Bai, M. Groenew. & Boekhout
- Colacogloea falcata (Nakase, Itoh & M. Suzuki) Q.M. Wang, F.Y. Bai, M. Groenew. & Boekhout
- Colacogloea foliorum (Ruinen) Q.M. Wang, F.Y. Bai, M. Groenew. & Boekhout
- Colacogloea hydrangeae Q.M. Wang, F.Y. Bai & A.H. Li
- Colacogloea papilionacea R. Kirschner & Oberw.
- Colacogloea peniophorae (Bourdot & Galzin) Oberw., R. Bauer & Bandoni
- Colacogloea philyla (Van der Walt, Klift & D.B. Scott) Q.M. Wang, F.Y. Bai, M. Groenew. & Boekhout
- Colacogloea retinophila (Thanh, M.S. Smit, Moleleki & Fell) Q.M. Wang, F.Y. Bai, M. Groenew. & Boekhout
- Colacogloea rhododendri Q.M. Wang, F.Y. Bai & A.H. Li
- Colacogloea subericola (Belloch, Villa-Carv., Álv.-Rodríg. & Coque) Q.M. Wang & F.Y. Bai
- Colacogloea terpenoidalis (Thanh, M.S. Smit, Moleleki & Fell) Q.M. Wang, F.Y. Bai, M. Groenew. & Boekhout
