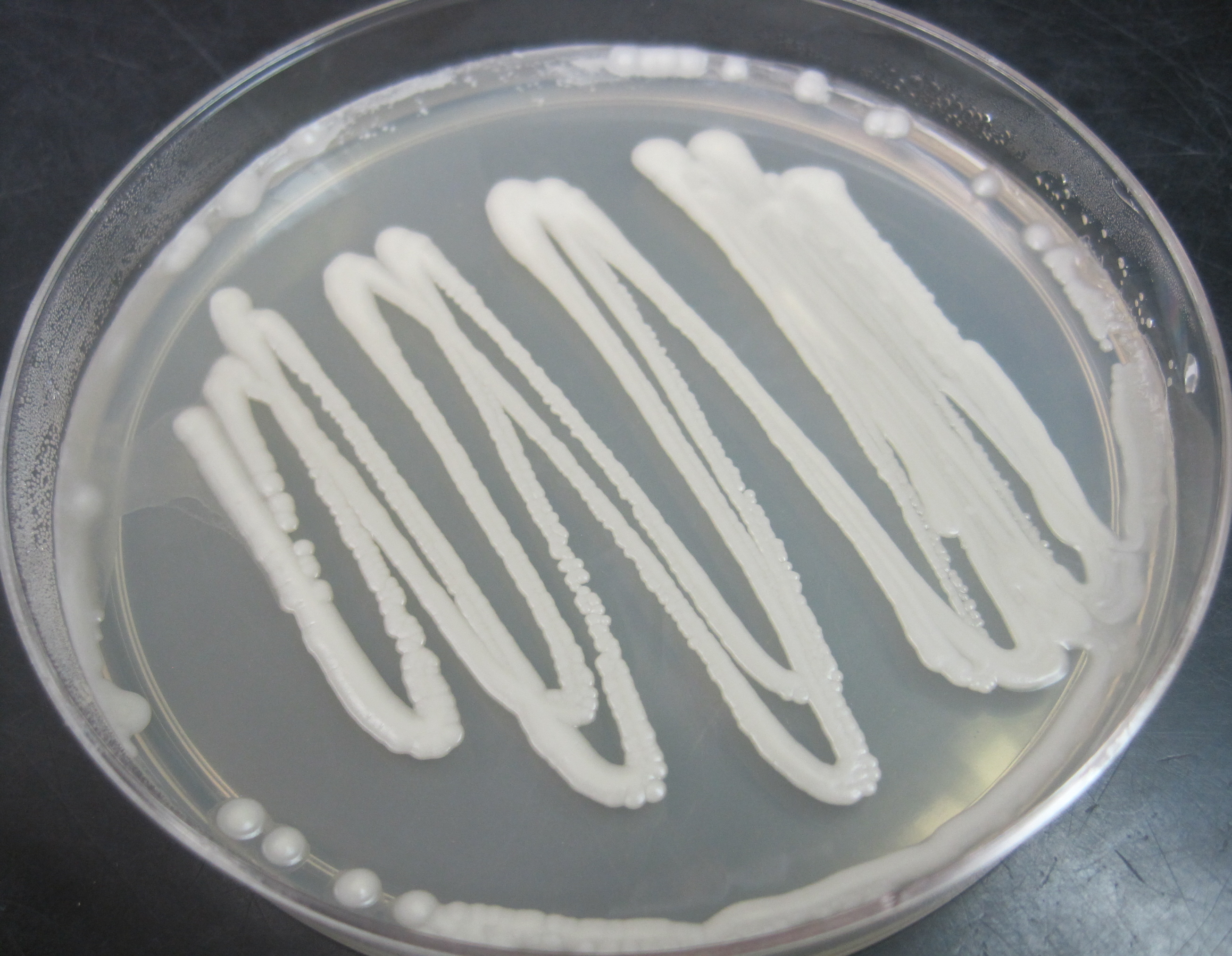
- Meredithblackwellia eburnea in culture

Scientific classification
- Domain: Eukaryota
- Kingdom: Fungi
- Division: Basidiomycota
- Class: Microbotryomycetes
- Order: Kriegeriales; Toome & Aime (2013)

Families
- Camptobasidiaceae; Kriegeriaceae

= Kriegeriales =

Order of fungi

The Kriegeriales are an order of fungi in the subdivision Pucciniomycotina. Most species are known only from their yeast states and can be found in a variety of habitats, ranging from arctic waters to tropical ferns. Hyphal states produce auricularioid (laterally septate) basidia.

== Taxonomy ==
The order was described in 2013 based on evidence from DNA sequence data that showed that a newly discovered neotropical yeast, Meredithblackwellia eburnea, was closely related to several species in the genera Kriegeria, Camptobasidium and Glaciozyma. Further research added the new genera Phenoliferia and Yamadamyces to accommodate several yeast species formerly placed in Rhodotorula.

== Morphology ==
Most species of Kriegeriales are asexually reproducing yeasts that do not currently have a known sexual state. All are white or cream, with elongated cells that reproduce by budding at either end. A handful of species have been studied in greater detail and for these it has been shown that the nuclear division of the yeast state occurs in the bud, a common character shared with most other basidiomycete yeasts. However, in Meredithblackwellia eburnea, Kriegeria eriophori, and Yamadamyces rosulatus budding cells remain attached to each other at the base, forming characteristic clusters of cells that are otherwise unknown in basidiomycete yeasts. The species in Glaciozyma differ in that these are yeasts with a known sexual state. Only two members of Kriegeriales, Kriegeria eriophori and Camptobasidium hydrophilum, are known to form hyphae. Of these, K. eriophori also has an asexual yeast state, leaving C. hydrophilum as the only species in the order that is hyphal throughout its life cycle. Ultrastructural studies of these two hyphal species have determined that they have simple septal pores, as is true for all other known Pucciniomycotina.

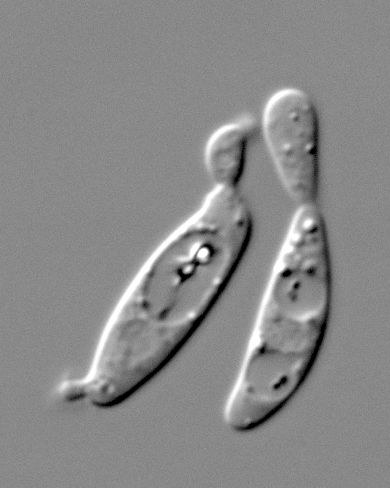
Budding yeast cells of a member of Kriegeriales

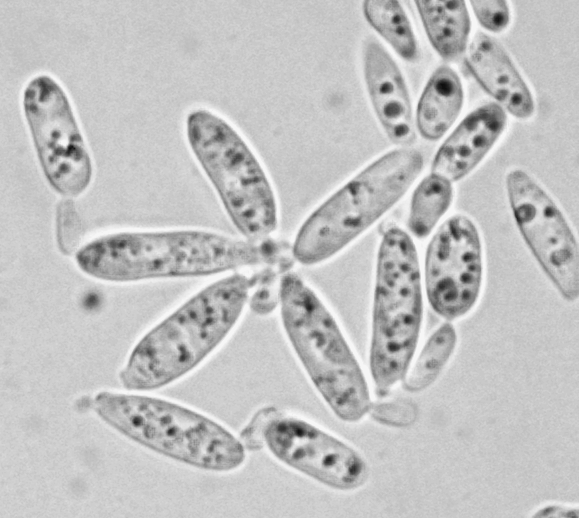
Rosette-like cell clusters formed by Meredithblackwellia eburnea

== Habitat and distribution ==
Species of Kriegeriales can be found in a variety of ecological niches. The members known to date include plant parasites (Kriegeria eriophori), aquatic fungi (Camptobasidium hydrophilum), saprobes, or have unknown roles in nature. Some have been isolated from psychrophilic environments and are associated with glaciers or the Antarctic sea. For example Glaciozyma antarctica was one of the first basidiomycete yeasts ever isolated from the Antarctic sea. Others have been isolated from the leaf surfaces of various plants both from temperate and tropical regions; their role in these habitats is unknown.
