= Spiculogloeales =

Scientific classification
- Kingdom: Fungi
- Division: Basidiomycota
- Class: Spiculogloeomycetes
- Order: Spiculogloeales; R.Bauer, Begerow, J.P.Samp., M.Weiss & Oberw. (2006)
- Family: Spiculogloeaceae; Denchev (2009)

Genera
- Phyllozyma Q.M. Wang, F.Y. Bai, M. Groenew. & Boekhout (2015); Spiculogloea P. Roberts (1996)

Class of fungi

The Spiculogloeales are an order of fungi in the subdivision Pucciniomycotina of the Basidiomycota. The order is currently monotypic, consisting of a single family, the Spiculogloeaceae. Species in the genus Phyllozyma are currently known only from their yeast states. Species in the genus Spiculogloea form hyphal states that produce auricularioid (laterally septate) basidia and are parasitic on other fungi.
