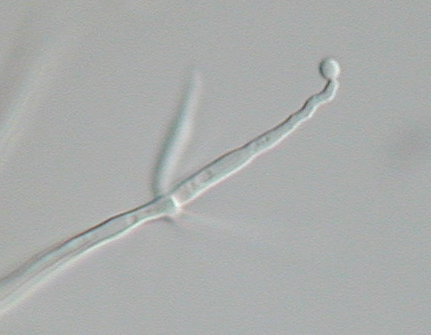

Scientific classification
- Kingdom: Fungi
- Division: Basidiomycota
- Class: Tritirachiomycetes
- Order: Tritirachiales
- Family: Tritirachiaceae
- Genus: Tritirachium
- Species: T. oryzae

Binomial name
- Tritirachium oryzae (Vincens) de Hoog (1972)

Synonyms
- Beauveria oryzae Vincens (1910); Beauveria heimii Saccas (1948); Tritirachium violaceum Tatarenko (1952)

= Tritirachium oryzae =

Species of fungus

Tritirachium oryzae is a fungus in the Basidiomycota often mistaken for a member of the Ascomycota. it is a mesophile linked recently with human pathogenicity in multiple, rare cases. This species produces airborne spores and is an endophyte of several plant species in North America, South America and in the Middle East.

== History of taxonomy ==
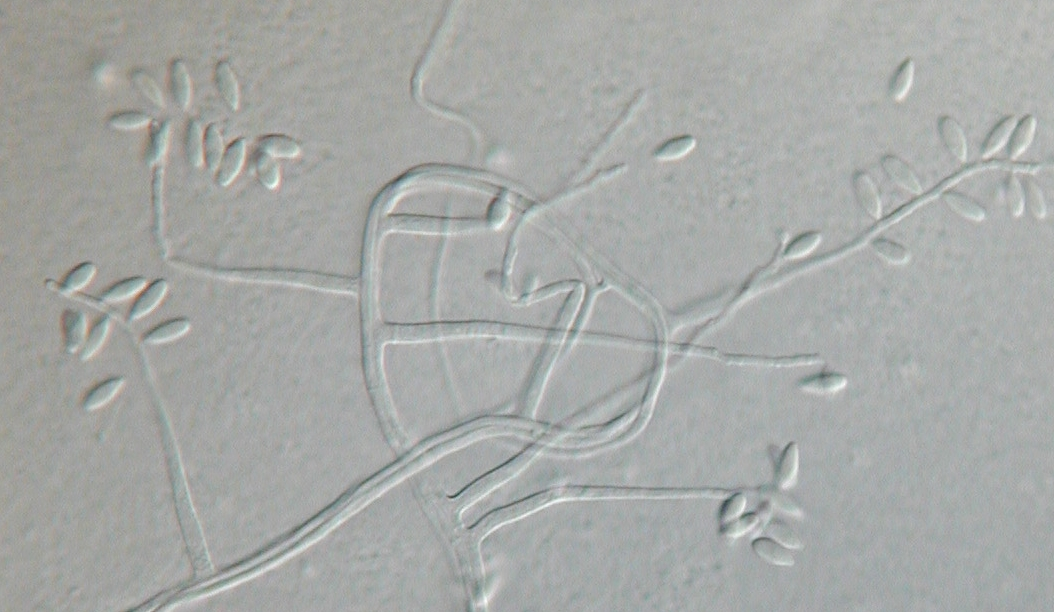
Photomicrograph of Tritirachium oryzae in Nomarski Differential Interference Contrast microscopy

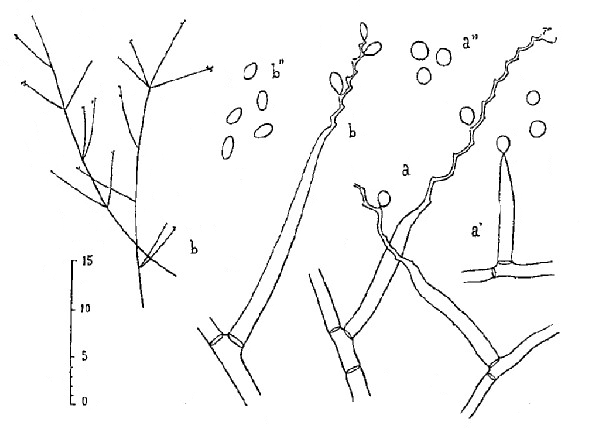
Original illustration of Tritirachium oryzae (as Beauveria oryzae) by M.-F. Vincens

Tritirachium oryzae was first described as Beauveria oryzae by Vincens in 1923 in a study of fungi on rice in the French Vietnamese colony of Cochinchina. The species epithet, "oryzae" derives from the Latin, orza, meaning rice. In 1940, Limber created the genus Tritirachium based on the zig-zag nature of the conidiom bearing cells that resembled the flowering rachis ofTriticum. Saccas independently rediscovered the fungus and named it Beauveria heimii in 1948. In 1972, de Hoog re-evaluated these fungi and confirmed the correct name to be Tritirachium oryzae. The fungus is a member of the phylum, Basidiomycota, distantly related to the rust fungi.

== Morphology ==
Tritirachium oryzae is an asexual fungus that grows well at 25-28 °C aerobically. It develops distinctly purple colonies with a velvet-like surface and pale to dark reddish-brown reverse coloration. Colonies consist of pale to brown smooth thin-walled hyphae. Conidia-bearing hyphae branch off and taper to form long and flat thick-walled arms, which have a characteristic zig-zag form. Conidia are 2.5 x 2.1 μm with a glassy-like appearance and are formed in spirals on conidiogenous cells The microorganism resembling wheat flowering heads. Conidia readily break free of the bearing cells and become airborne. Identification can be readily established using either morphological or molecular genetic methods.

== Ecology ==
Tritirachium oryzae is commonly found on soil and decaying plant material and has been reported on maize and other crops. The fungus has been isolated from paper, vegetable fibres, textiles and adhesives, and is infrequently found in insulation materials, wood and ceiling tiles. This fungus has been reported globally in Iran, Pakistan, India, Brazil, and the United States.

== Pathogenicity ==
Tritirachium oryzae can either act as a symbiont such as in Himalayan blue pine and other plants, or as an opportunistic pathogen of insects and humans. Human infection has been recorded multiple times under nails, in the cornea, and in the scalp, but produces little pathological substances harmful to humans. These infections are readily treated by azole topical drugs such as ketoconazole, itraconazole and posaconazole. The fungus is potentially active against gram-positive and gram-negative bacteria, and is active against the plant pathogen Ceratocystis fimbriata and Staphylococcus aureus.
