= Holtermannia =

Scientific classification
- Domain: Eukaryota
- Kingdom: Fungi
- Division: Basidiomycota
- Class: Tremellomycetes
- Order: Holtermanniales
- Genus: Holtermannia; Sacc. & Traverso (1910)

Type species
- Holtermannia pinguis (Holterm.) Sacc. & Traverso

Genus of fungi

Holtermannia is a genus of fungi in the order Holtermanniales. Species produce groups of horn-like gelatinous basidiocarps (fruit bodies) on wood and have associated yeast states. The genus is distributed in southeast Asia and Brazil, and contains six species.

The genus name of Holtermannia is in honour of Carl Holtermann (1866 - 1923) (Norwegian-)German botanist (Mycology) and Professor of Botany at the University of Berlin.

The genus was circumscribed by Pier Andrea Saccardo and Giovanni Battista Traverso in Syll. Fung. vol.19 on page 871 in 1910.

== Species known ==
According to GBIF;

- Holtermannia coralloides Kobayasi
- Holtermannia corniformis Kobayasi
- Holtermannia damicornis (Möller) Kobayasi
- Holtermannia pinguis (Holterm.) Sacc. & Traverso
- Holtermannia prolifera (Pat.) Kobayasi
- Holtermannia pulchella (Pat. & Har.) Kobayasi
