= Leucosporidiales =

Scientific classification
- Kingdom: Fungi
- Division: Basidiomycota
- Class: Microbotryomycetes
- Order: Leucosporidiales; J.P.Samp., M.Weiss & R.Bauer (2003)
- Family: Leucosporidiaceae; Jülich (1982)

Type genus
- Leucosporidium Fell, Statzell, I.L.Hunter & Phaff (1969)

Order of fungi

The Leucosporidiales are an order of fungi in the class Microbotryomycetes. The order contains a single family, the Leucosporidiaceae, which in turn contains a single genus, Leucosporidium. The order comprises fungi that are mostly known from their yeast states, though some produce hyphal states in culture that give rise to teliospores from which auricularioid (laterally septate) basidia emerge.
