= Spiculogloeomycetes =

Scientific classification
- Kingdom: Fungi
- Division: Basidiomycota
- Subdivision: Pucciniomycotina
- Class: Spiculogloeomycetes; Q.M. Wang, F.Y. Bai, M. Groenew. & Boekhout (2015)

Orders
- Spiculogloeales R.Bauer, Begerow, J.P.Samp., M.Weiss & Oberw. (2006)

Class of fungi

The Spiculogloeomycetes are a class of fungi in the subdivision Pucciniomycotina of the Basidiomycota. The class consists of a single order, the Spiculogloeales, together with an additional, unassigned genus, Meniscomyces. Many species are currently known only from their yeast states. Species in the genus Spiculogloea form hyphal states that produce auricularioid (laterally septate) basidia and are parasitic on other fungi.

== Taxonomy ==
The genus Spiculogloea was described in 1996 and provisionally placed in the order Platygloeales within the former class Heterobasidiomycetes.

In 2004, molecular research, based on cladistic analysis of DNA sequences, indicated that an unnamed Spiculogloea species clustered together with an equally unnamed Mycogloea species, forming a well-supported clade that was later referred to as the new order Spiculogloeales. Together with the Agaricostilbales, the Spiculogloeales were referred to as the class Agaricostilbomycetes.

A subsequent molecular study based upon seven genes indicated that the Spiculogloeales form a clade with the Mixiomycetes, rather than being most closely related to the Agaricostilbales. Based on this finding, the class Spiculogloeomycetes was proposed to accommodate Spiculogloea and its allies.
