= Colacogloeaceae =

Scientific classification
- Kingdom: Fungi
- Division: Basidiomycota
- Class: Microbotryomycetes
- Family: Colacogloeaceae; Q.M. Wang, F.Y. Bai, M. Groenew. & Boekhout (2015)

Type genus
- Colacogloea Oberw. & Bandoni (1991)

Genera
- Colacogloea; Udeniozyma

Family of fungi

The Colacogloeaceae are a family of fungi in the class Microbotryomycetes. Members of the family produce yeast states; hyphal states, where known, give rise to auricularioid (laterally septate) basidia and are parasitic on other fungi.
