= Agaric =

Fungal fruiting body

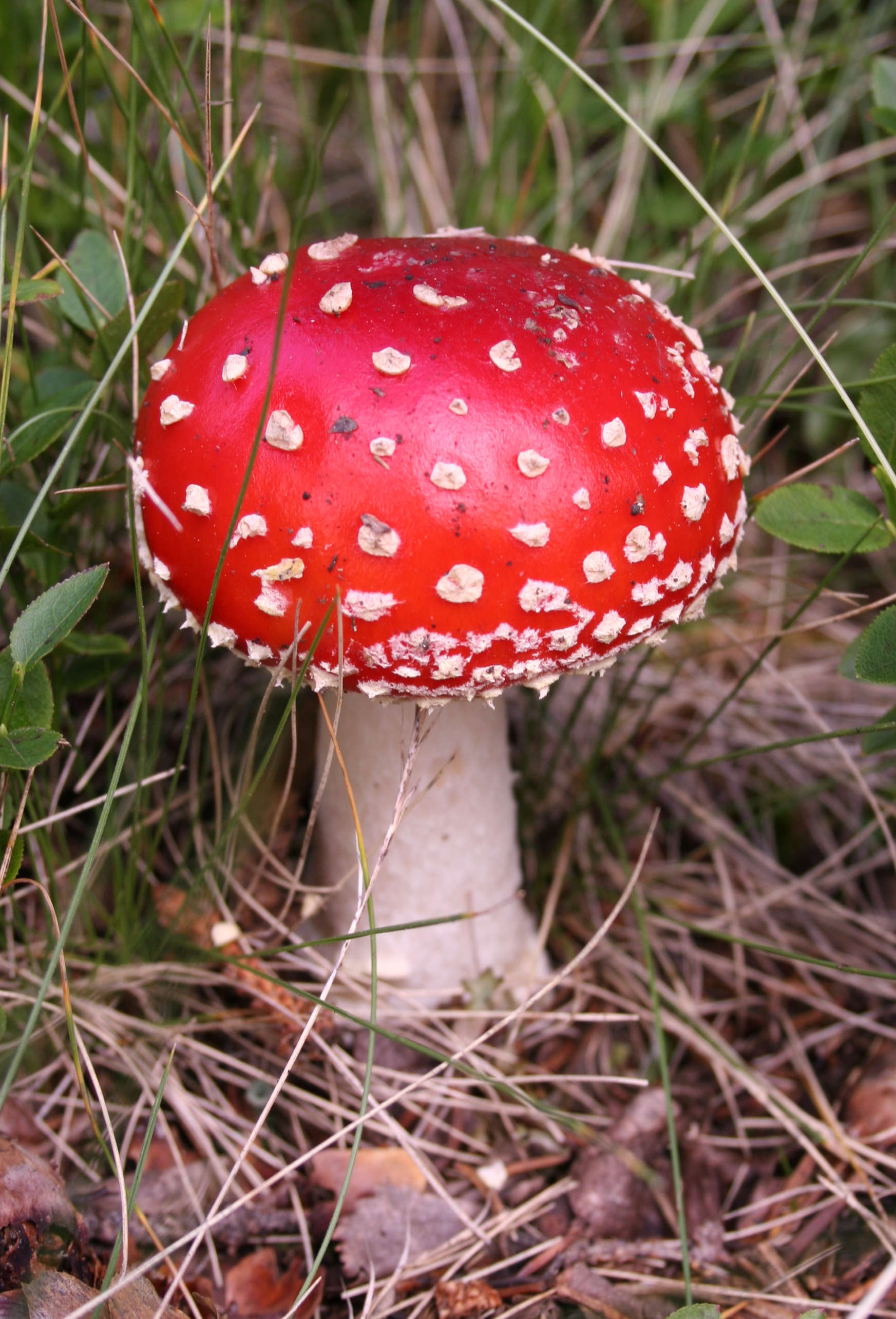
The fly agaric, Amanita muscaria, late August, Norway

An agaric (/ˈæɡərɪk, əˈɡærɪk/) is a type of fungal fruiting body characterized by the presence of a pileus (cap) that is clearly differentiated from the stipe (stalk), with lamellae (gills) on the underside of the pileus. It is a type of mushroom (or toadstool), the diverse group of agarics being lumped together as gilled mushrooms. "Agaric" can also refer more generally to any basidiomycete species characterized by an agaric-type fruiting body.

== Etymology ==
Originally, agaric meant 'tree-fungus' (after Latin agaricum); however, that changed with the Linnaean interpretation in 1753 when Linnaeus used the generic name Agaricus for gilled mushrooms.

== Taxonomy ==
Most species of agarics belong to the order Agaricales in the subphylum Agaricomycotina. The exceptions, where agarics have evolved independently, feature largely in the orders Russulales, Boletales, Hymenochaetales, and several other groups of basidiomycetes. Old systems of classification placed all agarics in the Agaricales and some (mostly older) sources use "agarics" as the colloquial collective noun for the Agaricales. Contemporary sources now tend to use the term euagarics to refer to all agaric members of the Agaricales. "Agaric" is also sometimes used as a common name for members of the genus Agaricus, as well as for members of other genera; for example, Amanita muscaria is known by its common name "fly agaric". The genus Agaricus was first described by Carl Linnaeus in 1753, and back then it contained all agarics. In the 19th century, Elias Magnus Fries split the genus into several smaller genera. More recently, DNA studies revealed that agarics are not necessarily closely related to each other, and that mushroom gills are an example of convergent evolution.
