= Rosettozymales =

Scientific classification
- Kingdom: Fungi
- Division: Basidiomycota
- Class: Microbotryomycetes
- Order: Rosettozymales; Q.M. Wang & F.Y. Bai (2020)
- Family: Rosettozymaceae; Q.M. Wang & F.Y. Bai (2020)

Type genus
- Rosettozyma Q.M. Wang & F.Y. Bai (2020)

Order of fungi

The Rosettozymales are an order of fungi in the class Microbotryomycetes. The order contains a single family, the Rosettozymaceae, which in turn contains a single genus, Rosettozyma. The order comprises fungi that are currently only known from their yeast states, isolated from plant leaves in China. Budding cells in yeast colonies always form rosette-like clusters, hence the name of the order.
