= Holtermanniales =

Scientific classification
- Kingdom: Fungi
- Division: Basidiomycota
- Class: Tremellomycetes
- Order: Holtermanniales; Libkind, Wuczkowski, Turchetti & Boekhout (2011)

Genera
- Holtermannia; Holtermanniella

Order of fungi

The Holtermanniales are an order in the fungal class Tremellomycetes. The order contains two genera. Species of Holtermannia produce groups of horn-like gelatinous basidiocarps (fruit bodies) on wood and have associated yeast states. Species of Holtermaniella are only known as yeasts.
