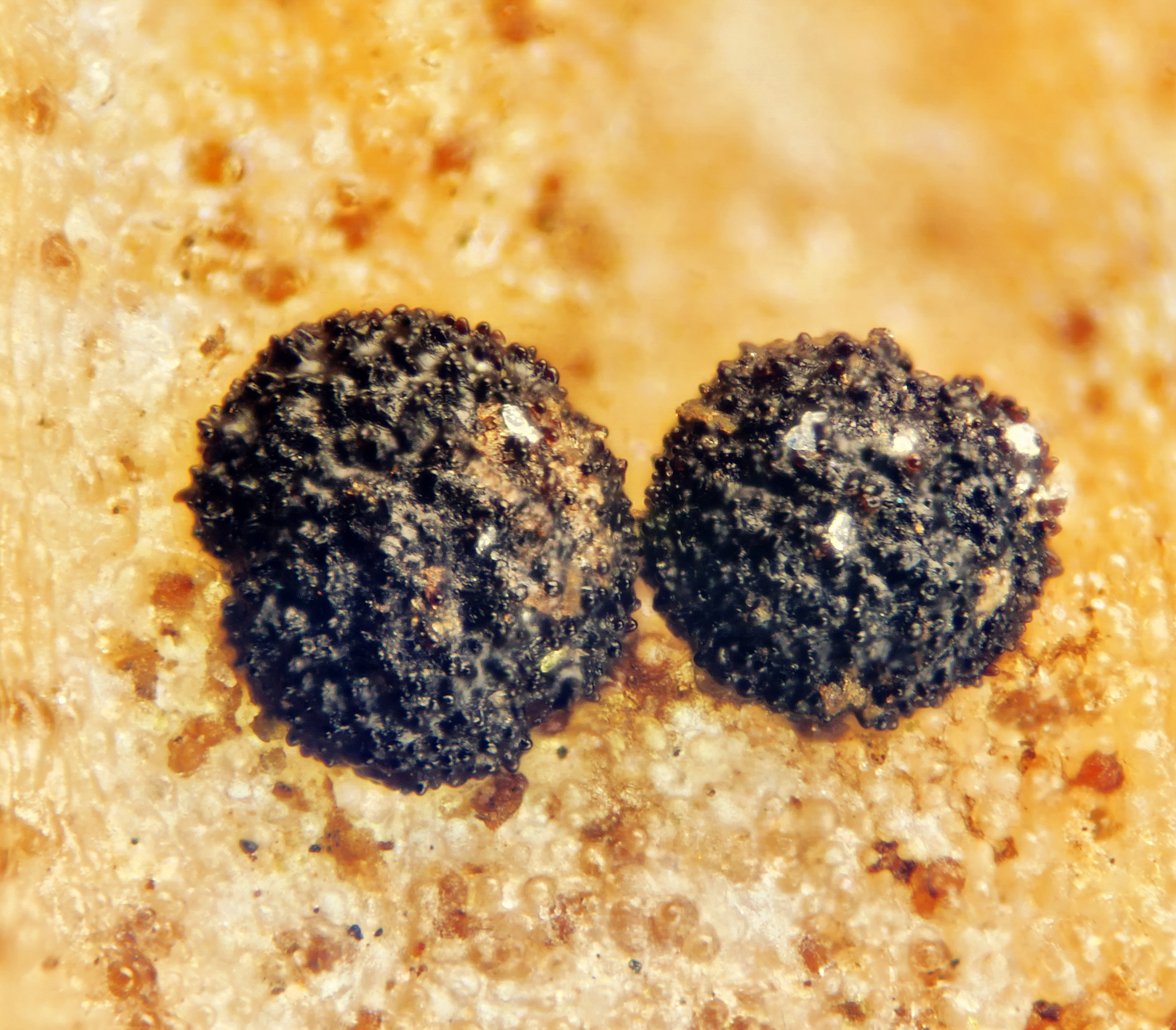
- Closeup view
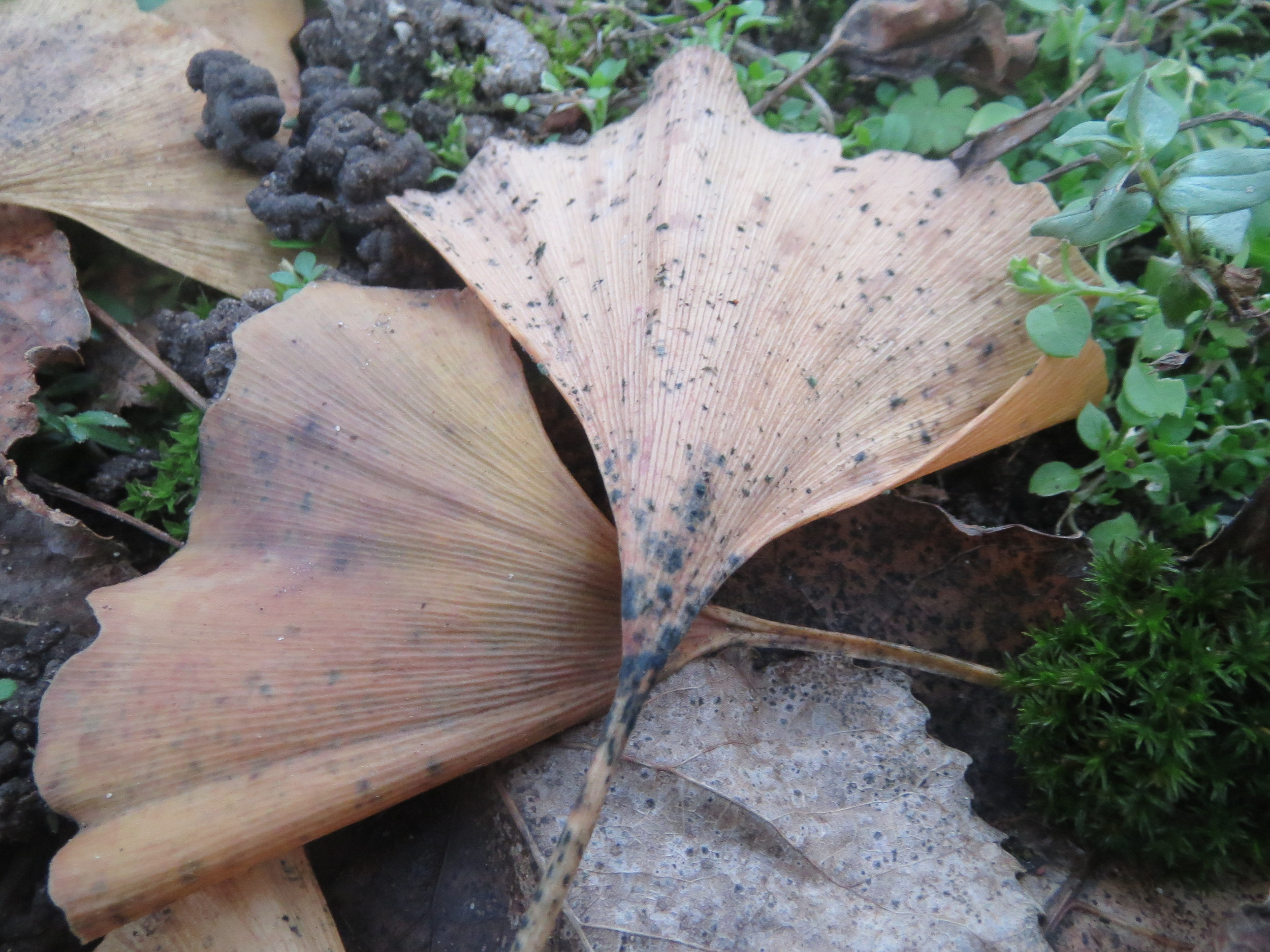
- Macroscopic view

Scientific classification
- Kingdom: Fungi
- Division: Basidiomycota
- Subdivision: Agaricomycotina
- Class: Bartheletiomycetes; Thines (2017)
- Order: Bartheletiales; Thines (2017)
- Family: Bartheletiaceae; R.Bauer, Scheuer, M.Lutz & Grube (2008)
- Genus: Bartheletia; G.Arnaud ex Scheuer, R.Bauer, M.Lutz, Stabenth., Melnik & Grube (2008)
- Species: B. paradoxa

Binomial name
- Bartheletia paradoxa G.Arnaud ex Scheuer, R.Bauer, M.Lutz, Stabentheiner, Melnik & Grube (2008)

= Bartheletia =

Class of fungi

Bartheletia paradoxa is a species of dimorphic fungus and is the only member of the genus Bartheletia. Bartheletia is the only genus in the family Bartheletiaceae, which is the only family in Bartheletiales, which in turn is the only order in the class Bartheletiomycetes.

Sorus-like sporodochia form on freshly fallen leaves and petioles of Ginkgo biloba in early autumn in Asia and Europe and persist through the winter. They produce slimy, hyaline, single-celled, cylindrical conidia. Thick-walled, dark brown teliospores develop in leaf tissue, clustered in structures about 1 mm diameter, similar to telia of rust fungi, causing black leaf spots surrounded by a gray halo. After a year of dormancy, long-stalked basidia emerge through an apical channel from each teliospore, becoming round, cruciately-septate, and producing a succession of cylindrical basidiospores from four wart-like loci.

Cultures can be isolated from discharged basidiospores or conidia spread on standard agar media.

Like its host G. biloba, B. paradoxa has no closely related (living) relatives and is considered a "living fossil".
