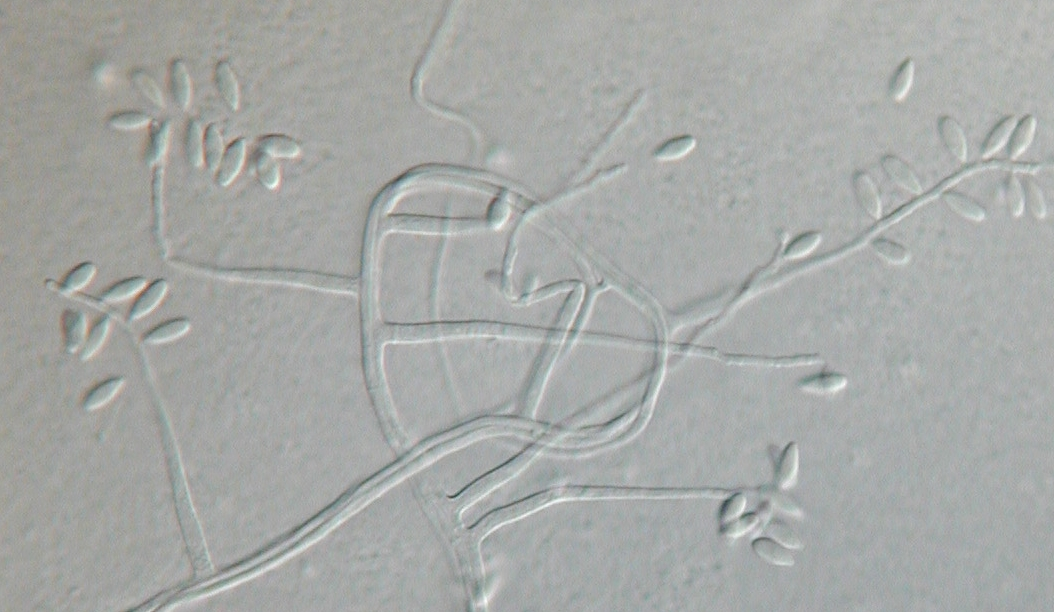
- Photomicrograph of Tritirachium oryzae

Scientific classification
- Kingdom: Fungi
- Division: Basidiomycota
- Subdivision: Pucciniomycotina
- Class: Tritirachiomycetes; Aime & Schell
- Order: Tritirachiales; Aime & Schell
- Family: Tritirachiaceae; Aime & Schell

Genera
- Tritirachium; Paratritirachium

= Tritirachiaceae =

Family of fungi

The Tritirachiomycetes are class of fungi in the Pucciniomycotina. The class contains a single order, the Tritirachiales, which in turn contains the single family Tritirachiaceae. Currently, two genera, Tritirachium and Paratritirachium, are recognized in this lineage.
