= Cryptomycocolacomycetes =

Scientific classification
- Kingdom: Fungi
- Division: Basidiomycota
- Subdivision: Pucciniomycotina
- Class: Cryptomycocolacomycetes; R. Bauer, Begerow, J.P. Samp., M. Weiss & Oberw.
- Order: Cryptomycocolacales; Oberw. & R. Bauer
- Family: Cryptomycocolacaceae; Oberw. & R. Bauer

Genera
- Colacosiphon; Cryptomycocolax

Class of fungi

The Cryptomycocolacomycetes are a class of fungi in the Pucciniomycotina subdivision of the Basidiomycota. The class contains a single order, the Cryptomycocolacales, which in turn contains the single family Cryptomycocolacaceae. The family has two monotypic genera.
