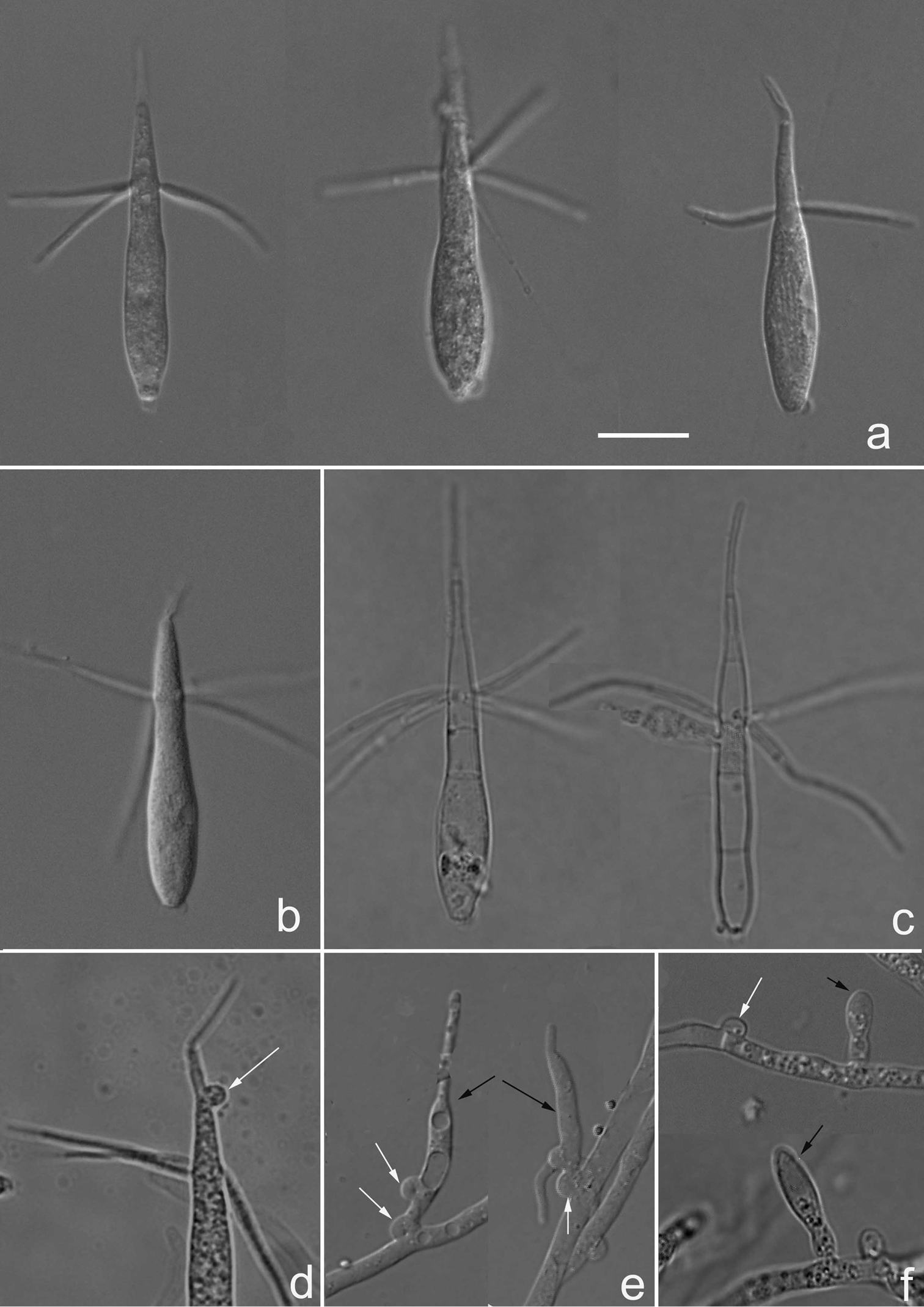
- Classicula sinensis

Scientific classification
- Kingdom: Fungi
- Division: Basidiomycota
- Subdivision: Pucciniomycotina
- Class: Classiculomycetes; R.Bauer, Begerow, J.P. Samp., M.Weiss & Oberw. (2006)
- Order: Classiculales; R.Bauer, Begerow, Oberw. & Marvanová (2003)
- Family: Classiculaceae; R.Bauer, Begerow, Oberw. & Marvanová (2003)

Genera
- Classicula; Jaculispora

= Classiculomycetes =

Class of fungi

The Classiculomycetes are a class of fungi in the Pucciniomycotina subdivision of the Basidiomycota. The class contains a single order, the Classiculales, which in turn contains the single family Classiculaceae. The family contains two monotypic genera.

They belong to a morpholigical group called "aquatic hyphomycetes" which are fungi that grow on submerged decaying plant matter, but they are also found as mycoparasites and endophytes. This is only an informal descriptive group which is divided phylogenetically between asco types (the great majority) and basidio types (a small percentage of hyphomycetes). The Classiculomycetes belong to the basidiomycete minority.
