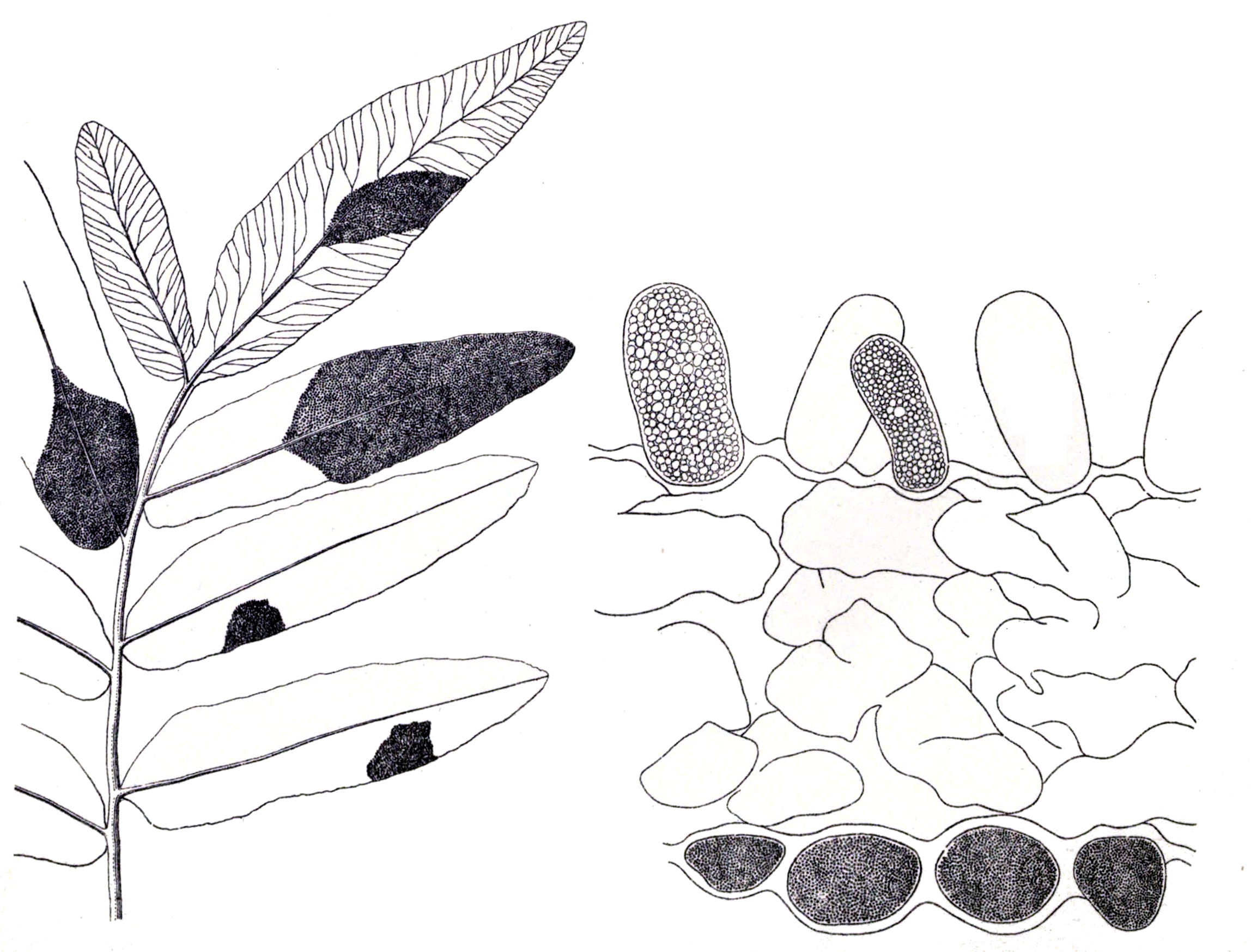

Scientific classification
- Kingdom: Fungi
- Division: Basidiomycota
- Subdivision: Pucciniomycotina
- Class: Mixiomycetes; R.Bauer, Begerow, J.P.Samp., M.Weiss & Oberw. (2006)
- Order: Mixiales; R.Bauer, Begerow, J.P.Samp., M.Weiss & Oberw. (2006)
- Family: Mixiaceae; C.L.Kramer (1987)
- Genus: Mixia; C.L.Kramer (1958)
- Species: M. osmundae

Binomial name
- Mixia osmundae (Nishida) C.L.Kramer (1958)

= Mixiomycetes =

Class of fungi

The Mixiomycetes are a class of fungi in the Pucciniomycotina subdivision of the Basidiomycota. The class contains a single order, the Mixiales, which in turn contains a single family, the Mixiaceae that circumscribes the monotypic genus Mixia. Only one species has been described to date, Mixia osmundae; this species was originally named Taphrina osmundae by Japanese mycologist Toji Nishida in 1911. It is characterized by having multinucleate hyphae, and by producing multiple spores on sporogenous cells.

The genus name of Mixia is in honour of Arthur Jackson Mix (1888-1956), who was an American mycologist, who worked at the University of Kansas and used to study of the 'Taphrinales'.

The genus was circumscribed by Charles Lawrence Kramer in Mycologia vol.50 (Issue 6) on page 924 in 1958.
