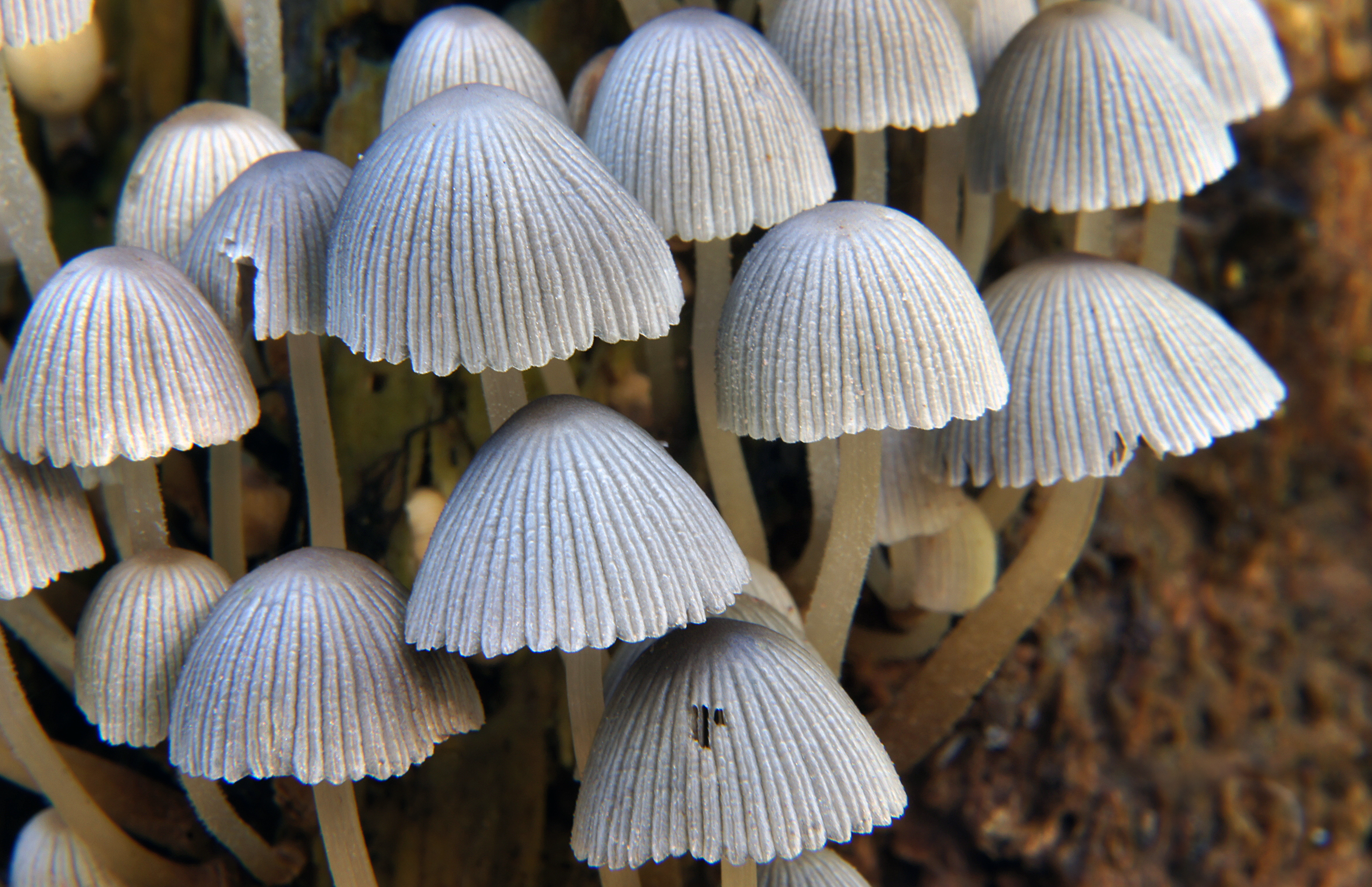
- Coprinellus disseminatus (Agaricomycetes)

Scientific classification
- Kingdom: Fungi
- Division: Basidiomycota
- Subdivision: Agaricomycotina; Doweld (2001)

Classes
- Agaricomycetes; Bartheletiomycetes; Dacrymycetes; Tremellomycetes

= Agaricomycotina =

Subdivision of fungi

Agaricomycotina is one of three subdivisions of the Basidiomycota (fungi bearing spores on basidia), and represents many fungi which form macroscopic fruiting bodies. Agaricomycotina contains over 30,000 species, divided into three classes: Tremellomycetes, Dacrymycetes, and Agaricomycetes. Around 98% of the species are in the class Agaricomycetes, including all the agarics (gilled mushrooms), bracket fungi, clavarioid fungi, corticioid fungi, and gasteroid fungi. Tremellomycetes contains many basidiomycete yeasts and some conspicuous jelly fungi. Dacrymycetes contains a further group of jelly fungi. These taxa are founded on molecular research, based on cladistic analysis of DNA sequences, and supersede earlier morphology-based classifications. Agaricomycotina contains nearly one third of all described species of fungi.

The class Bartheletiomycetes contains a single anomalous species of basidiomycete which grows on fallen leaves of Ginkgo biloba. Some researchers suggest that this class should be included in Agaricomycotina.

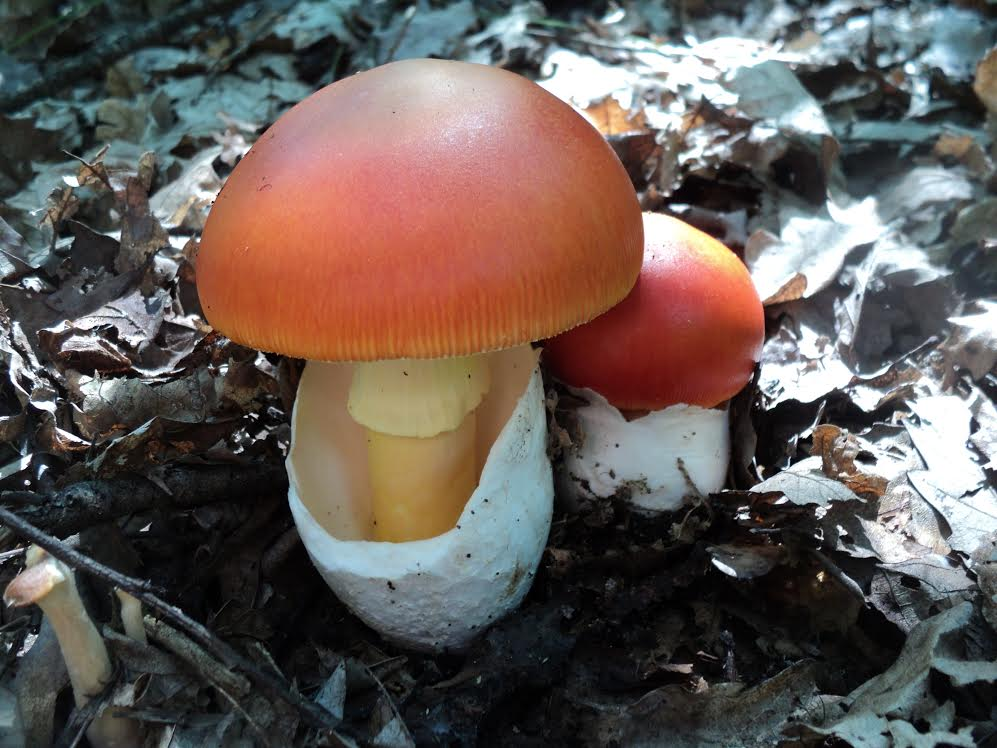
Amanita caesarea (Agaricomycetes)

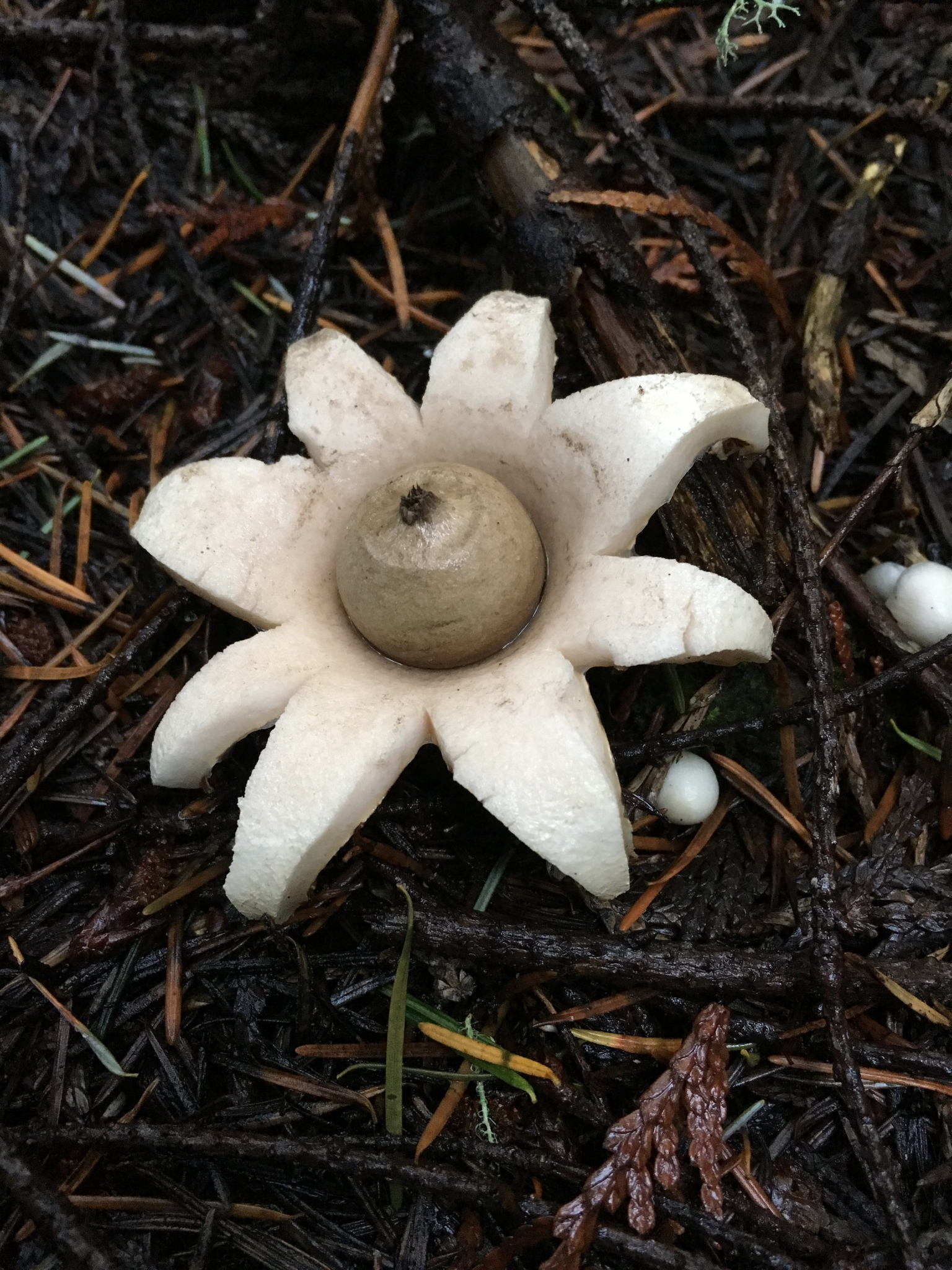
Geastrum saccatum (Agaricomycetes)

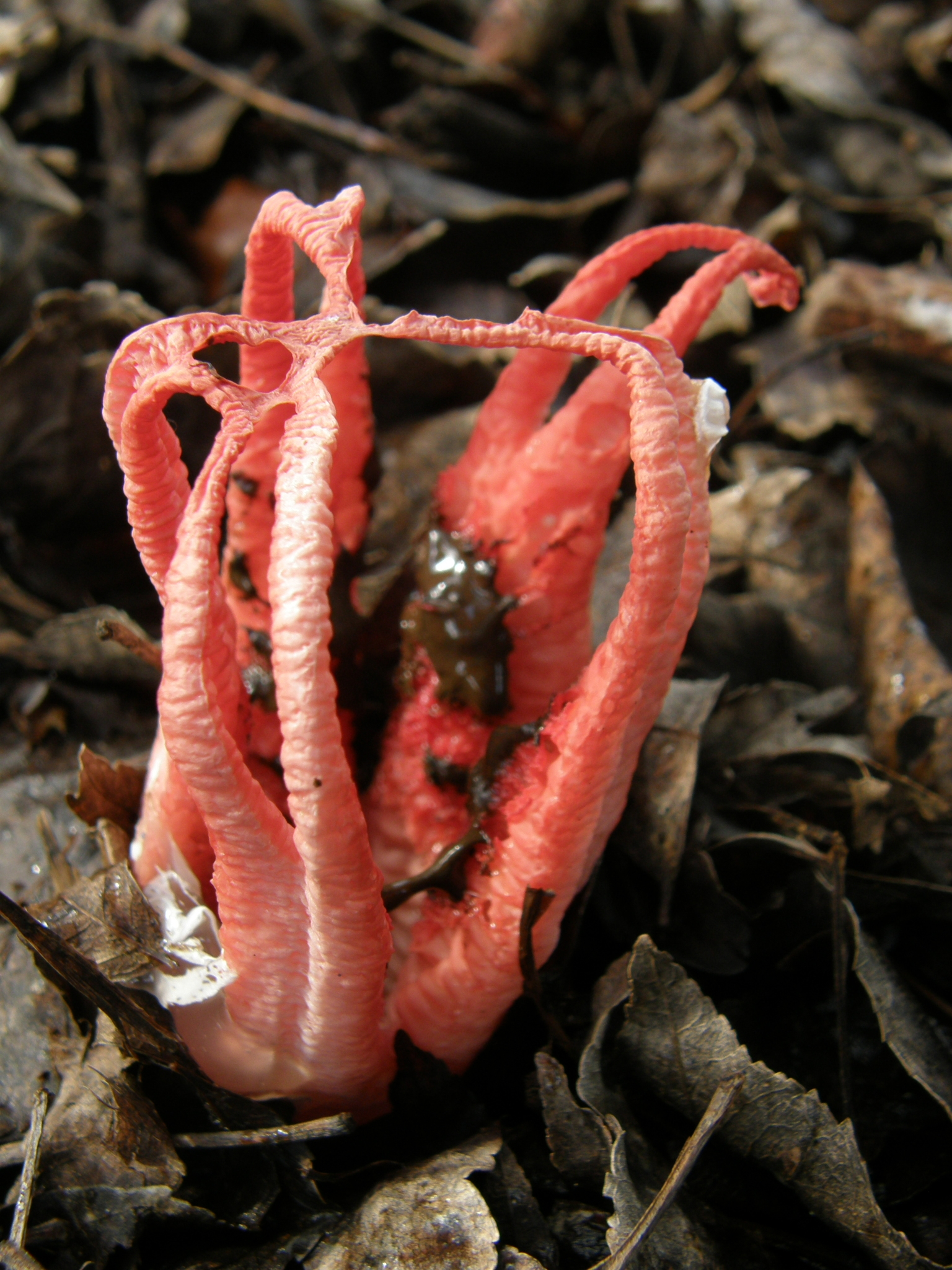
Clathrus archeri (Agaricomycetes)

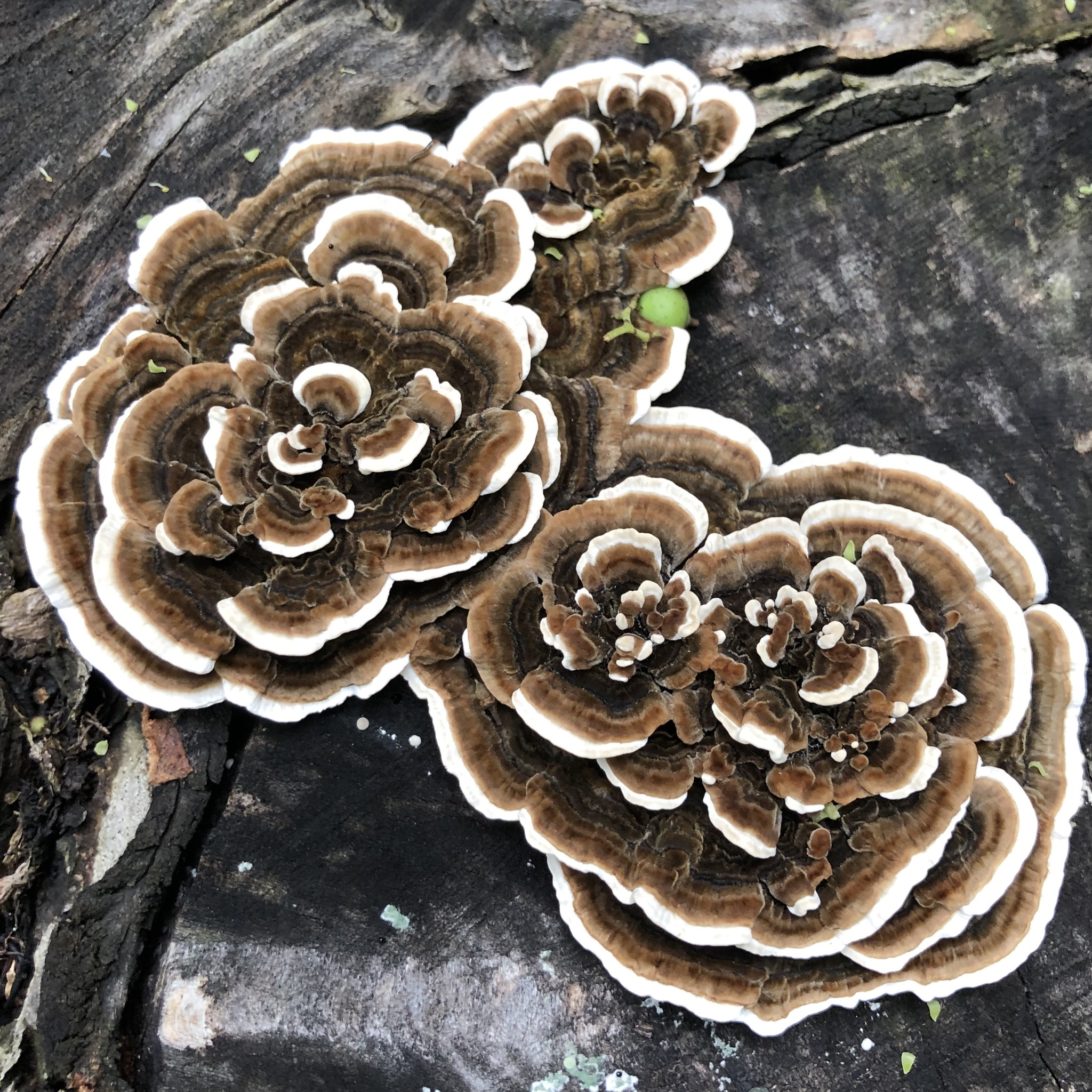
Trametes versicolor (Agaricomycetes)

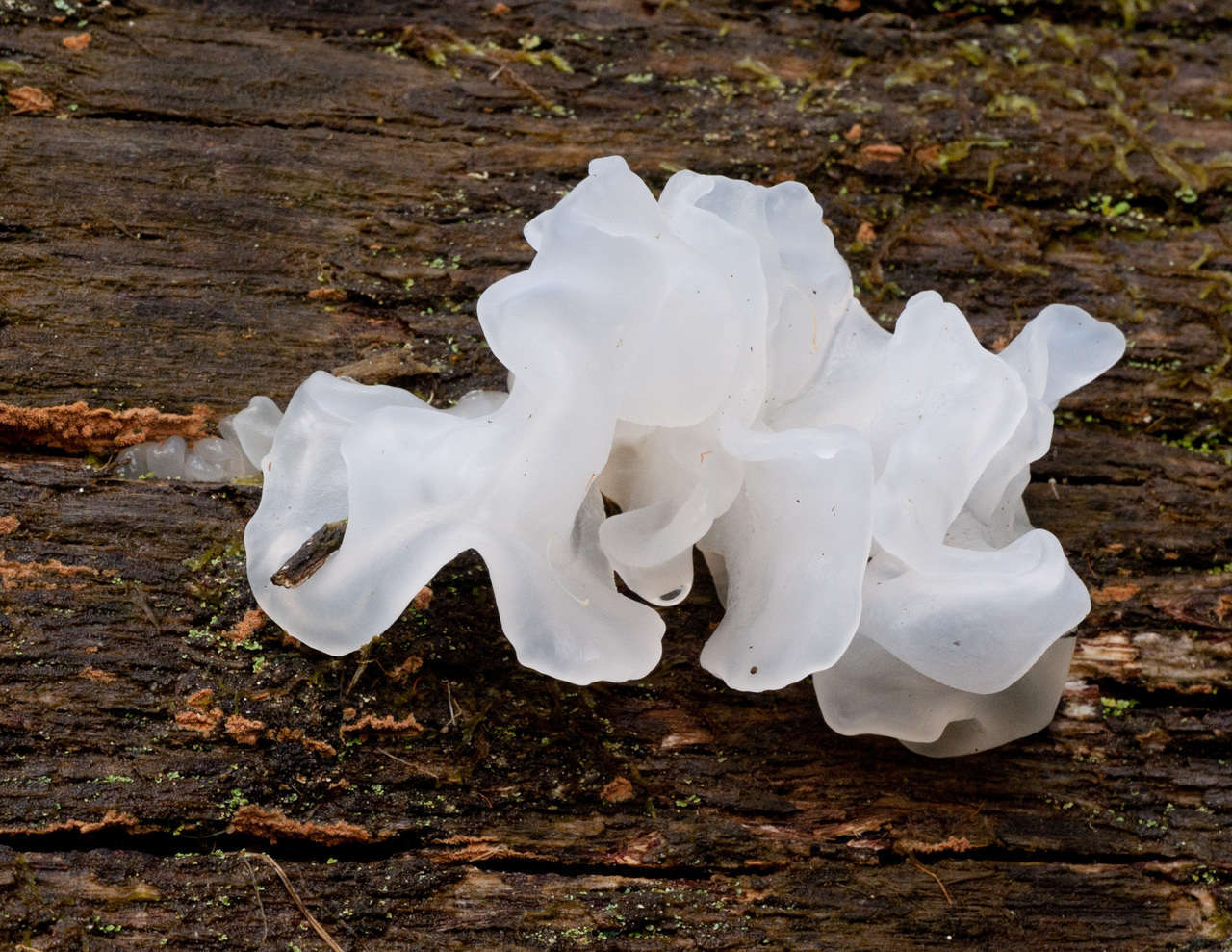
Tremella fuciformis (Tremellomycetes)

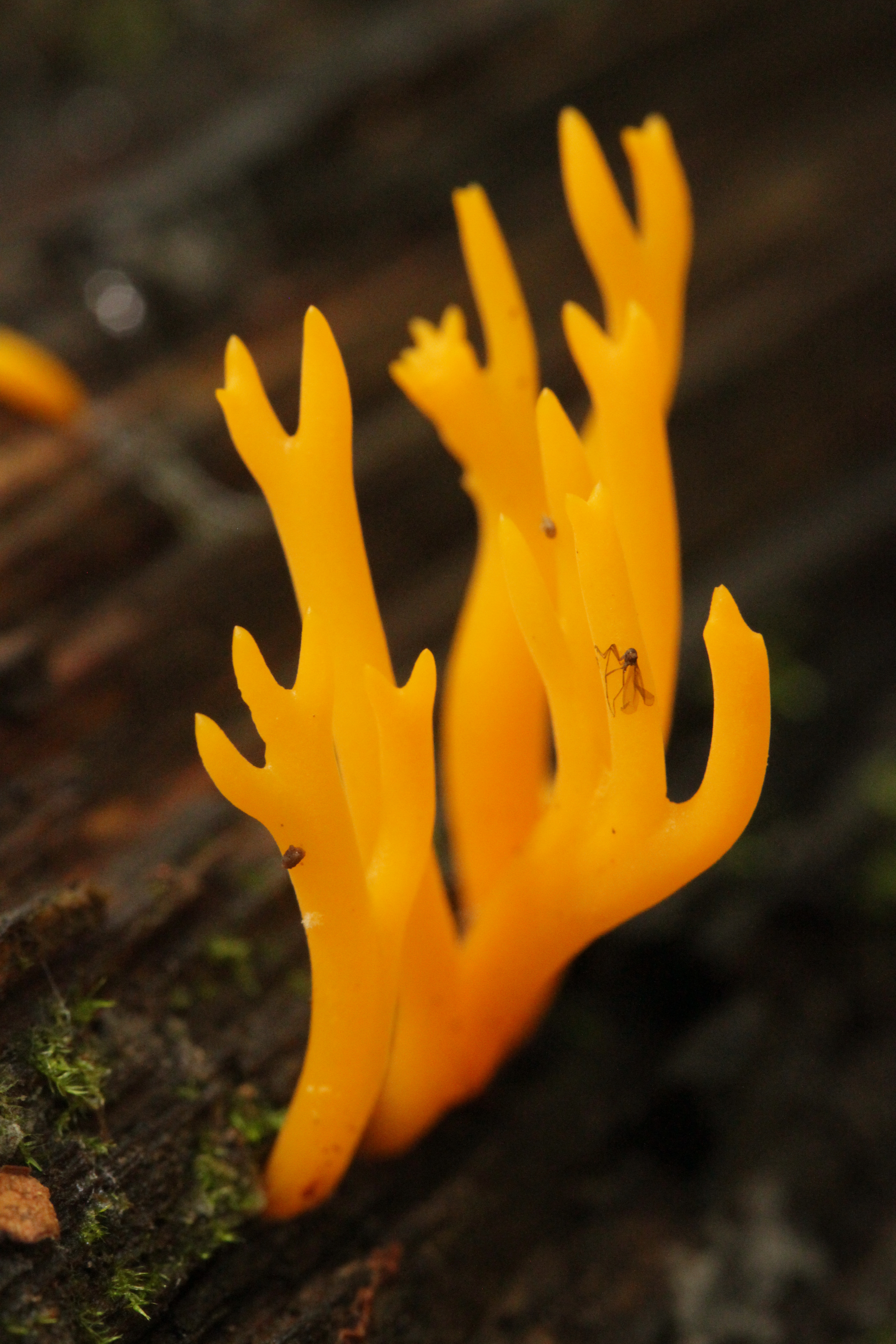
Calocera viscosa
(Dacrymycetes)
