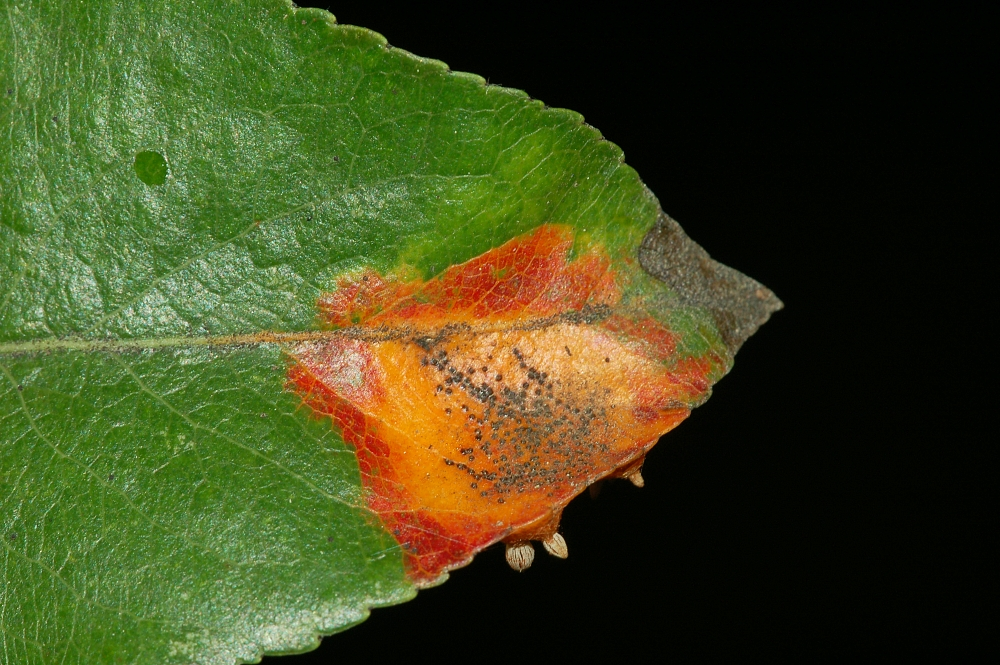
- Gymnosporangium fuscum

Scientific classification
- Kingdom: Fungi
- Division: Basidiomycota
- Subdivision: Pucciniomycotina; R.Bauer, Begerow, J.P.Samp., M.Weiß & Oberw. (2006)

Classes
- Agaricostilbomycetes; Atractiellomycetes; Classiculomycetes; Cryptomycocolacomycetes; Cystobasidiomycetes; Microbotryomycetes; Mixiomycetes; Pucciniomycetes; Spiculogloeomycetes; Tritirachiomycetes

Synonyms
- Urediniomycotina

= Pucciniomycotina =

Subdivision of fungi

Pucciniomycotina is a subdivision of fungus within the division Basidiomycota. The group was known as Urediniomycetes until 2006, when it was elevated from a class to a subdivision and named after the largest order in the group, Pucciniales.

The subdivision contains 10 classes, 21 orders, and 38 families. Over 8400 species of Pucciniomycotina have been described; thus, the subdivision contains more than 8% of all described fungi.

Pucciniomycotina appears to be sister to Agaricomycotina, based on maximum-likelihood analysis of six genes.

== Morphology ==
There is a high morphological diversity in the Pucciniomycontina. The sporulating forms range from macrobasidiocarp to single-celled yeasts. The presence of simple septal pores, and disc-like spindle pole bodies unites Pucciniomycotina and distinguishes it from the sister groups. The predominance of mannose in the cell walls is also a uniting feature of the group.

== Ecology ==
Pucciniomycotina have a diverse range of ecologies as insect parasites, mycoparasites, and orchid mycorrhiza; some have been detected in soil and water or asymptotic members living on leaves. Most are plant pathogens. Many Pucciniomycotina are rust fungi and are placed in the order Puccinales that contains roughly 7800 species (c. 90% of the group). Some members of the group are of economical importance as a pathogen on a wide range of commercial plants, e.g. wheat. Pucciniomycotina is a cosmopolite and exists all over the world. Pucciniomycotina may even be present in Arctic ice, and in oxygen-poor deep sea habitats.

== Life cycle ==
Some members are only known from their anamorphs, and asexual stages predominate in most; in some species this is the only known form. A striking characteristic of Puccinomycotina is the unique developmental pattern. Rust Fungi or plant pathogenic members in Puccinales have the most complex life cycles known in the fungal kingdom, with five different spore stages. Studies have shown that Puccinales also has one of the largest genomes in the fungi kingdom, and that genome size expansion may be common. This explains the complex life cycles within the group.

== Classes ==
- Agaricostilbomycetes
- Atractiellomycetes
- Classiculomycetes
- Cryptomycocolacomycetes
- Cystobasidiomycetes
- Microbotryomycetes
- Mixiomycetes
- Pucciniomycetes
- Semicentenialomycetes

== Other sources ==
- M.C. Aime et al.: An overview of the higher level classification of Pucciniomycotina based on combined analyses of nuclear large and small subunit rDNA sequences. Mycologia, Band 98, 2006, S. 896–905.
- Robert Bauer, Dominik Begerow, José Paulo Sampaio, Michael Weiβ, Franz Oberwinkler: The simple-septate basidiomycetes: a synopsis. Mycological Progress, Band 5, 2006, S. 41–66, ISSN 1617-416X, doi:10.1007/s11557-006-0502-0.
