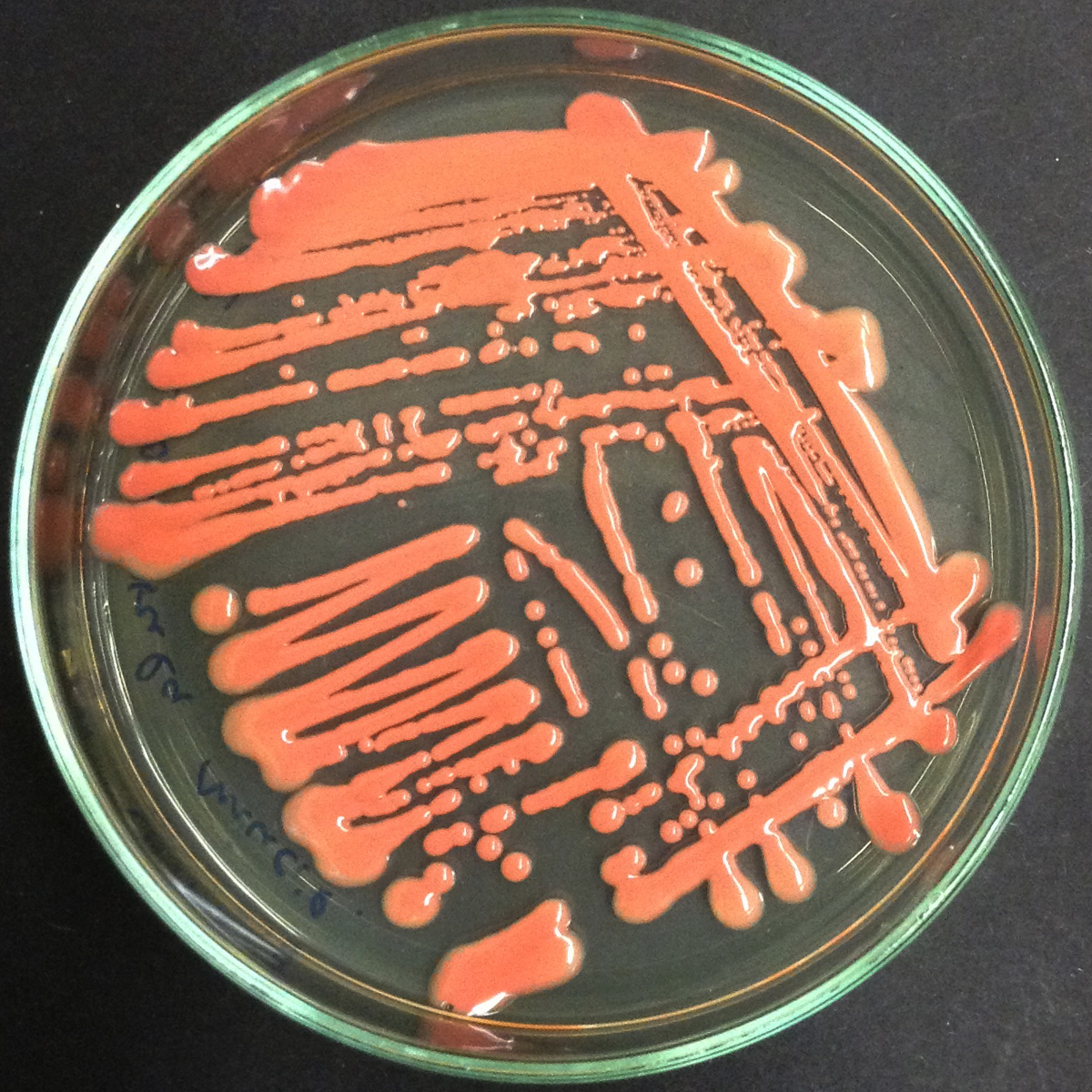
- Rhodotorula mucilaginosa, yeast colony in culture

Scientific classification
- Kingdom: Fungi
- Division: Basidiomycota
- Subdivision: Pucciniomycotina
- Class: Microbotryomycetes; R. Bauer, Begerow, J.P.Samp., M.Weiss & Oberw. (2006)

Orders
- Curvibasidiales; Heitmaniales; Heterogastridiales; Kriegeriales; Leucosporidiales; Microbotryales; Rosettozymales; Sporidiobolales

= Microbotryomycetes =

Class of fungi

The Microbotryomycetes are a class of fungi in the subdivision Pucciniomycotina of the Basidiomycota. The class currently contains eight orders, plus three additional, unassigned families (Chrysozymaceae, Colacogloeaceae, and Mycogloiocolacaceae), plus seven additional, unassigned genera (Oberwinklerozyma, Pseudohyphozyma, Reniforma, Spencerozyma, Trigonosporomyces, Vonarxula, and Yunzhangia). Many species are known only from their yeast states. Species with hyphal states typically produce auricularioid (laterally septate) basidia and are often parasitic on other fungi or plants. Several species in the genera Rhodotorula and Sporobolomyces are opportunistic human pathogens.
