= Geminibasidiomycetes =

Scientific classification
- Kingdom: Fungi
- Division: Basidiomycota
- Class: Geminibasidiomycetes

Class of fungi

Geminibasidiomycetes is a class of dikaryotic fungus classified in 2015. Geminibasidiomycetes are heat resistant
