= Diamesini =

Scientific classification
- Kingdom: Animalia
- Phylum: Arthropoda
- Clade: Pancrustacea
- Class: Insecta
- Order: Diptera
- Family: Chironomidae
- Subfamily: Diamesinae
- Tribe: Diamesini; Pagast, 1947

Genera
- See text

Tribe of flies

Diamesini is a tribe of midges in the non-biting midge family (Chironomidae).

== Genera & species ==
- Genus Arctodiamesa Makarchenko, 1983
  - A. appendiculata (Lundström, 1915)
  - A. breviramosa Makarchenko, 1995
  - A. marinae Makarchenko, 2005
- Genus Diamesa Meigen in Gistl, 1835
  - D. aberrata Lundbeck, 1898
  - D. alata Storå, 1945
  - D. alpina Tokunaga, 1936
  - D. amanoi Makarchenko & Kobayashi, 1997
  - D. amplexivirilia Hansen, 1976
  - D. ancysta Roback, 1959
  - D. arctica (Boheman, 1865)
  - D. bertrami Edwards, 1935
  - D. bohemani Goetghebuer, 1932
  - D. cheimatophila Hansen, 1976
  - D. chiobates Hansen, 1976
  - D. chorea Lundbeck, 1898
  - D. cinerella Meigen in Gistl, 1835
  - D. clavata Edwards, 1933
  - D. colenae Hansen, 1976
  - D. dactyloidea Makarchenko, 1988
  - D. dampfi (Kieffer, 1924)
  - D. davisi Edwards, 1933
  - D. filicauda Tokunaga, 1966
  - D. garretti Sublette & Sublette, 1965
  - D. geminata Kieffer, 1926
  - D. goetghebueri Pagast, 1947
  - D. gregsoni Edwards, 1933
  - D. hamaticornis Kieffer, 1924
  - D. haydaki Hansen, 1976
  - D. heteropus (Coquillett, 1905)
  - D. hyperborea Holmgren, 1869
  - D. incallida (Walker, 1856)
  - D. insignipes Kieffer in Kieffer & Thienemann, 1908
  - D. japonica Tokunaga, 1936
  - D. kasymovi Kownacki & Kownacka, 1973
  - D. laticauda Serra-Tosio, 1964
  - D. latitarsis (Goetghebuer, 1921)
  - D. lavillei Serra-Tosio, 1969
  - D. leona Roback, 1957
  - D. leoniella Hansen, 1976
  - D. lindrothi Goetghebuer, 1931
  - D. longipes Goetghebuer, 1941
  - D. macronyx (Kieffer, 1918)
  - D. martae Kownacki & Kownacka, 1980
  - D. mendotae Muttkowski, 1915
  - D. modesta Serra-Tosio, 1967
  - D. nivicavernicola Hansen, 1976
  - D. nivoriunda (Fitch, 1847)
  - D. nowickiana Kownacki & Kownacka, 1975
  - D. permacra (Walker, 1856)
  - D. plumicornis Tokunaga, 1936
  - D. serratosioi Willassen, 1986
  - D. simplex Kieffer, 1926
  - D. sommermani Hansen, 1976
  - D. spinacies Sæther, 1969
  - D. spitzbergensis Kieffer, 1919
  - D. starmachi Kownacki & Kownacka, 1970
  - D. steinboecki Goetghebuer, 1933
  - D. Sætheri Willassen, 1986
  - D. tenuipes Goetghebuer, 1938
  - D. thomasi Serra-Tosio, 1970
  - D. tonsa (Haliday in Walker, 1856)
  - D. tsutsuii Tokunaga, 1936
  - D. vaillanti Serra-Tosio, 1972
  - D. valkanovi Sæther, 1968
  - D. veletensis Serra-Tosio, 1971
  - D. vernalis Makarchenko, 1977
  - D. vockerothi Hansen, 1976
  - D. wuelkeri Serra-Tosio, 1964
  - D. zernyi Edwards, 1933
- Genus Lappodiamesa Serra-Tosio, 1968
  - L. multiseta Makarchenko, 1995
  - L. vidua (Kieffer, 1922)
  - L. willasseni Makarchenko et Kerkis, 1991
- Genus Pagastia Oliver, 1959
  - P. sequax (Garrett, 1925)
  - P. altaica Makarchenko Kerkis & Ivanchenko, 1997
  - P. lanceolata (Tokunaga, 1936)
  - P. nivis (Tokunaga, 1936)
  - P. orientalis (Tshernovskij, 1949)
  - P. orthogonia Oliver, 1959
  - P. partica (Roback, 1957)
- Genus Potthastia Kieffer, 1922
  - P. gaedii (Meigen, 1838)
  - P. iberica Serra-tosio, 1971
  - P. longimana Kieffer, 1922
  - P. montium (Edwards, 1929)
  - P. pastoris (Edwards, 1933)
- Genus Pseudodiamesa Goetghebuer, 1939
  - P. arctica (Malloch, 1919)
  - P. branickii (Nowicki, 1837)
  - P. latistyla Makarchenko, 1989
  - P. nivosa (Goetghebuer, 1932)
  - P. pertinax (Garrett, 1925)
  - P. stackelbergi (Goetghebuer, 1933)
- Genus Sympotthastia Pagast, 1947
  - S. fulva (Johannsen, 1921)
  - S. gemmaformis Makarchenko, 1994
  - S. huldeni Tuiskunen, 1986
  - S. macrocera Serra-Tosio, 1968
  - S. repentina Makarchenko, 1984
  - S. spinifera Serra-Tosio, 1968
  - S. takatensis (Tokunaga, 1936)
  - S. zavreli Pagast, 1947
- Genus Syndiamesa Kieffer, 1918
  - S. edwardsi (Pagast, 1947)
  - S. hygropetrica (Kieffer, 1909)
  - S. mira (Makarchenko, 1980)
  - S. nigra Rossaro, 1980
  - S. serratosioi Kownacki, 1981
  - S. yosiii Tokunaga, 1964
