= Smittium =

Scientific classification
- Domain: Eukaryota
- Kingdom: Fungi
- Division: Kickxellomycota
- Class: Harpellomycetes
- Order: Harpellales
- Family: Legeriomycetaceae
- Genus: Smittium; R.A.Poiss.

Species
- Many, see text

Genus of fungi

Smittium is a genus of fungi in the order Harpellales. It is the largest genus in the order. As of 2013, there were 81 described species. Many of these have been formally described only recently; in 1998 there were just 46. Several have been transferred to Smittium from other genera, such as Orphella, Rubetella, Genistella, and Typhella. In general, the genus has a cosmopolitan distribution, but some species are limited to small regions.

Like most other fungi of the Harpellales, these are found in the guts of insect larvae. Smittium are most often resident in the larvae of aquatic flies. The genus was named for Smittia, the midge from which it was first isolated. The fungi can be found in black flies, mosquitoes, solitary midges, and non-biting and biting midges. The relationship between the fungus and the fly is usually commensal. Sometimes it is more mutualistic, such as when the fungus synthesizes vitamins or other nutrients for the host. One species, though, Smittium morbosum, can best be described as parasitic on its mosquito larva host, killing it by preventing it from molting. No other gut fungi are known to be lethal to their hosts in this way.

The host larva is infected with Smittium when it ingests the fungal spore. Smittium generally live in the hindgut of the fly larva, attaching to the chitinous gut lining via a hypha. When the fungus produces spores, they are excreted by the host.

Sometimes several species can be found in the gut flora of one host. S. brevisporum, S. bulbosporophorus, and S. inexpectans have been noted growing together, for example. Other genera of gut fungi can be present, as well, such as Genistellospora. Some Smittium can be found in a number of hosts, while others are more host-specific. S. heterosporum has been collected from nonbiting midges of the genera Sympotthastia and Potthastia, and from Cricotopus bicinctus. S. culicis has been found in Culex pipiens and the genera Eukiefferiella and Chironomus. S. chinliense was found in a crane fly larva (Antocha sp.). Host-specific Smittium include S. dimorphum, which has only been observed in the midge Boreoheptagyia lurida.

Some Smittium are useful in laboratory experiments. They are unusually easy to propagate in pure culture, and some 40% of the many Smittium species have been established as axenic isolates.

Perhaps the best known species of the genus has been Smittium culisetae. It is widespread and found in several host species, especially mosquitoes. It has been used often in laboratory research. Recent morphological and molecular studies indicated that it is different from Smittium species in the positioning of its zygospore, the shape of its trichospore (a type of sporangium), the immune responses it induces in hosts, its isozymes, and other molecular characteristics. The fungus was renamed Zancudomyces culisetae and placed in a monotypic genus of its own, Zancudomyces.

Species include:

- Smittium aciculare
- Smittium acutum
- Smittium alpinum
- Smittium angustum
- Smittium annulatum
- Smittium arcticum
- Smittium arvernense
- Smittium basiramosum
- Smittium biforme
- Smittium bisporum
- Smittium brasiliense
- Smittium brevisporum
- Smittium bulbosporophorum
- Smittium bullatum
- Smittium caribense
- Smittium caudatum
- Smittium cellaspora
- Smittium chinliense
- Smittium chironomi
- Smittium coloradense
- Smittium commune
- Smittium compactum
- Smittium culicis
- Smittium culicisoides
- Smittium cylindrosporum
- Smittium delicatum
- Smittium dimorphum
- Smittium dipterorum
- Smittium ditrichosporum
- Smittium elongatum
- Smittium esteparum
- Smittium fasciculatum
- Smittium fastigatum
- Smittium fecundum
- Smittium fruticosum
- Smittium gigasporum
- Smittium gracilis
- Smittium gravimetallum
- Smittium hecatei
- Smittium heterosporum
- Smittium imitatum
- Smittium incrassatum
- Smittium inexpectans
- Smittium insulare
- Smittium kansense
- Smittium lentaquaticum
- Smittium longisporum
- Smittium macrosporum
- Smittium magnosporum
- Smittium megazygosporum
- Smittium microsporum
- Smittium minutisporum
- Smittium morbosum
- Smittium mucronatum
- Smittium naiadis
- Smittium nodifixum
- Smittium orthocladii
- Smittium ouselii
- Smittium paludis
- Smittium parvum
- Smittium pennelli
- Smittium perforatum
- Smittium phytotelmatum
- Smittium precipitiorum
- Smittium prostratum
- Smittium pseudodimorphum
- Smittium pusillum
- Smittium rarum
- Smittium rupestre
- Smittium shaanxiense
- Smittium simulatum
- Smittium simulii
- Smittium tipulidarum
- Smittium tronadorium
- Smittium tynense
- Smittium typhellum
- Smittium urbanum
