= C. iberica =

C. iberica may refer to:

- Centaurea iberica, the Iberian starthistle or Iberian knapweed, a plant species native to southeastern Europe
- Corixa iberica, a water boatman species
- Coronilla iberica, an ornamental plant species

== See also ==
- Iberica (disambiguation)
