= Harpellomyces abruptus =

Scientific classification
- Kingdom: Fungi
- Division: Kickxellomycota
- Class: Harpellomycetes
- Order: Harpellales
- Family: Harpellaceae
- Genus: Harpellomyces
- Species: H. abruptus

Binomial name
- Harpellomyces abruptus Lichtward, White, & Colbo (2001)

Species of fungus

Harpellomyces abruptus is a species of Kickxellomycotinan fungus.

== Discovery ==
Harpellomyces abruptus was first documented in the hindgut of the fly species Thaumalea verralli in Saint John's, Newfoundland and Labrador. Its binomial name was inspired by the abrupt, steep cliff that the first specimens were collected from.

== Description ==
Harpellomyces abruptus has a thallus measuring roughly 6-7 μm in diameter, which often branches at the base. Trichospores have been described as ellipsoidal, with lengths of 20-33 μm and widths of 7-11 μm, and bear 2-5 appendages upon release from the thallus. H. abruptus can be differentiated from the Harpellomyces type species, H. eccentricus, by the presence of a branched base and a thicker thallus.

== Distribution ==
In addition to Newfoundland and Labrador, H. abruptus has also been observed in Ontario.
