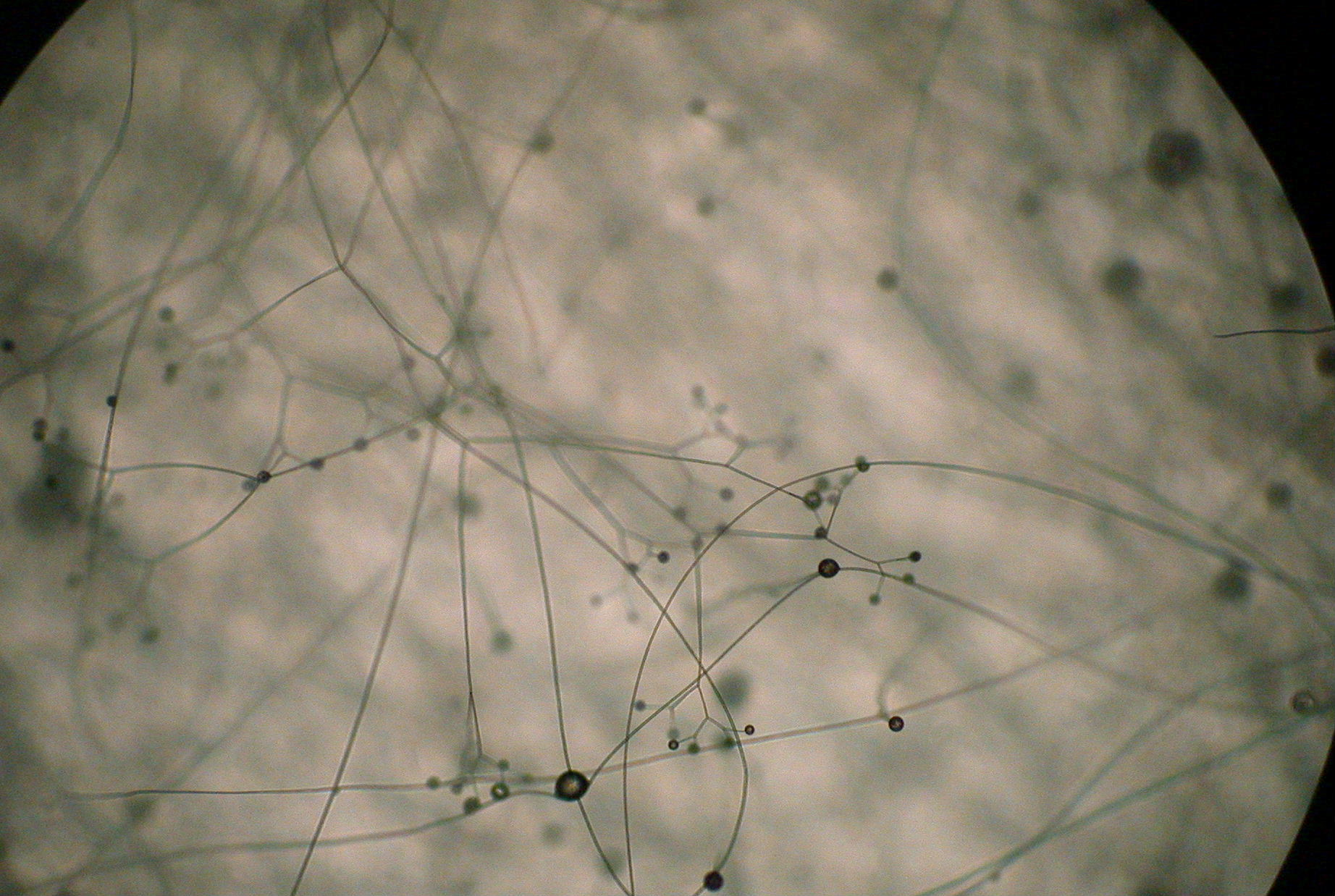
- Fertile heads of Piptocephalis

Scientific classification
- Kingdom: Fungi
- Subkingdom: Zoopagomyceta; Tedersoo et al. 2018

Phyla and subphyla
- Entomophthoromycota; Entomophthoromycotina; Kickxellomycota; Kickxellomycotina; Zoopagomycota; Zoopagomycotina

= Zoopagomyceta =

Subdivision of fungi

Zoopagomyceta is a subkingdom of fungi proposed in 2018. It is equivalent to the phylum Zoopagomycota M.E. Smith, Spatafora & Stajich in the original sense proposed in 2016.

== Classes and orders ==
- Phylum Entomophthoromycota Humber, Mycotaxon 2012, emend. Tedersoo et al. 2018 (emendation involves: removal of Basidiobolomycetes)
  - Subphylum Entomophthoromycotina Humber 2007
    - Class Entomophthoromycetes Humber 2012
    - Class Neozygitomycetes Humber 2012
- Phylum Kickxellomycota Tedersoo et al. 2018
  - Subphylum Kickxellomycotina Benny 2007
    - Class Kickxellomycetes Tedersoo et al. 2018
      - Order Kickxellales Kreisel ex R. K. Benj. 1979
    - Class Asellariomycetes Tedersoo et al. 2018
      - Order Asellariales Manier ex Manier & Lichtw. 1978
    - Class Barbatosporomycetes Tedersoo et al. 2018
      - Order Barbatosporales Doweld 2014
    - Class Dimargaritomycetes Tedersoo et al. 2018
      - Order Dimargaritales R. K. Benj. 1979
    - Class Harpellomycetes Tedersoo et al. 2018
      - Order Harpellales Lichtw. & Manier 1978
    - Class Ramicandelaberomycetes Tedersoo et al. 2018
      - Order Ramicandelaberales Doweld 2014
- Phylum Zoopagomycota M.E. Smith, Spatafora & Stajich 2016 emend. Tedersoo et al. 2018 (emendation involves: change of rank, corresponds to old Zoopagomycotina; other two subphyla raised to phyla)
  - Subphylum Zoopagomycotina Benny 2007
    - Class Zoopagomycetes Doweld 2014
