= Kickx =

Kickx is a surname. Notable people with the surname include:

- Jean Jacques Kickx (1842–1887), Belgian botanist, son of Jean
- Jean Kickx (1803–1864), Belgian botanist
- Jean Kickx (1775–1831), Belgian botanist and mineralogist, father of Jean
