= Iberica =

Iberica, a Latin word referring to the Iberian Peninsula, may refer to:

- a barangay in Iberica-Labo, Camarines Norte, Philippines
- Iberica, an extinct genus of multituberculate from Spain
- Centaurea iberica, the Iberian starthistle or Iberian knapweed, a plant species native to southeastern Europe
- Corixa iberica, a water boatman species
- Coronilla iberica, an ornamental plant species
- Forficula iberica, an earwig species
- Lallemantia iberica, a flowering plant in the family Lamiaceae.
- Potthastia iberica, a non-biting midge species
- Rana iberica, is a species of frog in the family Ranidae
