= Carouxella coemeteriensis =

Scientific classification
- Kingdom: Fungi
- Division: Kickxellomycota
- Class: Harpellomycetes
- Order: Harpellales
- Family: Harpellaceae
- Genus: Carouxella
- Species: C. coemeteriensis

Binomial name
- Carouxella coemeteriensis Lichtwardt, Ferrington & López-Lastra, 1999

Species of fungus

Carouxella coemeteriensis is a species of Kickxellomycotinan fungi.

== Discovery ==
Carouxella coemeteriensis was first discovered in the gut of a larva of the fly species Dasyhelea necrophila in a cemetery in La Plata, Argentina. Its binomial name comes from the greek word "koimeterion", meaning cemetery.

== Description ==
Carouxella coemeteriensis has been observed to attach to the hindgut of fly larvae with unbranched thalli, reaching roughly 800 μm in length and 7 μm in diameter. The thallus base is straight, not curved, which differentiates C. coemeteriensis from its close relative C. scalaris. Trichospores have been described as short and cylindrical with a slight median bulge. Zygospores range from 38-41 μm in length and are roughly 6 μm in width.

== Ecology ==
Carouxella coemeteriensis has been seen in larvae growing in flower vases left in cemeteries. It is believed to be introduced to new vases via oviposition by infected female flies. Once present in a vase, it can spread between larvae. C. coemeteriensis population sees seasonal changes, with the highest population recorded in July, suggesting a negative correlation between population growth and temperature.
