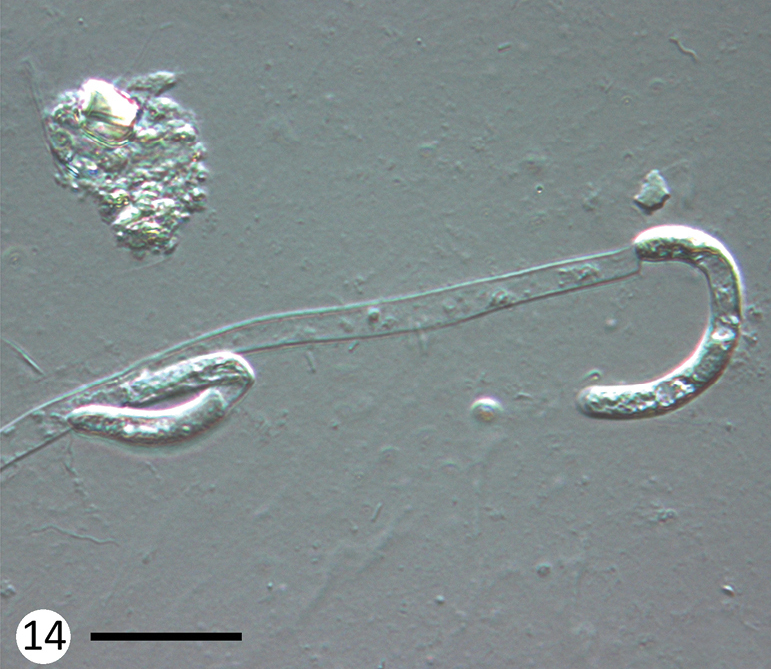
- Harpella melusinae

Scientific classification
- Domain: Eukaryota
- Kingdom: Fungi
- Division: Kickxellomycota
- Class: Harpellomycetes
- Order: Harpellales
- Family: Harpellaceae
- Genus: Harpella; L.Léger & Duboscq (1929)

Type species
- Harpella melusinae L.Léger & Duboscq (1929)

Species
- H. amazonica H. leptosa H. melusinae H. meridionalis H. tica

= Harpella (fungus) =

Genus of fungi

Harpella is a genus of fungi in the Harpellaceae family. The widespread genus contains five species that grow in Diptera.

The name Harpella is also applied to an insect.
