= Stachylinoides =

Scientific classification
- Domain: Eukaryota
- Kingdom: Fungi
- Division: Kickxellomycota
- Class: Harpellomycetes
- Order: Harpellales
- Family: Harpellaceae
- Genus: Stachylinoides; Lichtw. & López-Lastra (1999)
- Species: S. arctata

Binomial name
- Stachylinoides arctata Ferrington, Lichtw. & López-Lastra (1999)

Single-species genus of fungi

Stachylinoides is a fungal genus in the Harpellaceae family. The genus is monotypic, containing the single species Stachylinoides arctata, found in the gut of insect larvae in South America.
