= Carouxella =

Scientific classification
- Domain: Eukaryota
- Kingdom: Fungi
- Division: Kickxellomycota
- Class: Harpellomycetes
- Order: Harpellales
- Family: Harpellaceae
- Genus: Carouxella; Manier, Rioux & Whisler (1965)

Type species
- Carouxella scalaris Manier, Rioux & Whisler (1961)

Species
- Carouxella coemeteriensis Carouxella scalaris

Genus of fungi

Carouxella is a genus of fungi in the family Harpellaceae. The genus contains two species that grow in Diptera.
