= Stachylina =

Scientific classification
- Domain: Eukaryota
- Kingdom: Fungi
- Division: Kickxellomycota
- Class: Harpellomycetes
- Order: Harpellales
- Family: Harpellaceae
- Genus: Stachylina; L.Léger & M. Gauthier (1932)

Type species
- Stachylina macrospora L.Léger & M.Gauthier (1932)

Genus of fungi

Stachylina is a genus of fungi in the Harpellaceae family. The widespread genus contains 29 species that grow in Diptera.

== Species ==
- Stachylina acutibasilaris
- Stachylina ceratopogonidarum
- Stachylina chironomidarum
- Stachylina dolichospora
- Stachylina euthena
- Stachylina grandispora
- Stachylina gravicaudata
- Stachylina jujuyensis
- Stachylina lentica
- Stachylina litoralis
- Stachylina longa
- Stachylina lotica
- Stachylina macrospora
- Stachylina magna
- Stachylina manicata
- Stachylina minima
- Stachylina minuta
- Stachylina nana
- Stachylina paludosa
- Stachylina paucispora
- Stachylina pedifer
- Stachylina penetralis
- Stachylina platensis
- Stachylina prolifica
- Stachylina queenslandiae
- Stachylina reflexa
- Stachylina robusta
- Stachylina stenospora
- Stachylina thaumaleidarum
- Stachylina tianensis
