= Harpellomyces =

Scientific classification
- Domain: Eukaryota
- Kingdom: Fungi
- Division: Kickxellomycota
- Class: Harpellomycetes
- Order: Harpellales
- Family: Harpellaceae
- Genus: Harpellomyces; Lichtw. & S.T.Moss (1984)

Type species
- Harpellomyces eccentricus Lichtw. & S.T.Moss (1984)

Species
- Harpellomyces abruptus Harpellomyces eccentricus Harpellomyces montanus

Genus of fungi

Harpellomyces is a genus of fungi in the family Harpellaceae. The widespread genus contains three species that grow in Diptera.
