= Dimargaris verticillata =

Scientific classification
- Kingdom: Fungi
- Division: Kickxellomycota
- Class: Dimargaritomycetes
- Order: Dimargaritales
- Family: Dimargaritaceae
- Genus: Dimargaris
- Species: D. verticillata

Binomial name
- Dimargaris verticillata R.K. Benj., 1959

Species of fungus

Dimargaris verticillata is a species of fungus within Kickxellomycota.

== Discovery and taxonomy ==
D. verticillata was first described in 1959 from strains taken from mouse and frog dung in Claremont, California. It is named for its verticillately arranged sporophores.

== Description ==
When grown on yeast-starch agar, colonies of D. verticillata have been described as white, becoming cream-colored with age. Vegetative hyphae appear colorless, and are septate and branched, measuring roughly 2-4 μm in diameter. Haustoria begin simply, and become branched with growth.

Sporophores are erect and colorless, and become "irregularly verticillately branched" with time. Sporophores produce as many as 18 branches which contain 2 cells each and are between 35-100 μm in length; these branches bear white, fertile heads. Sporophores reach heights of roughly 1-3 mm; this can be used to differentiate D. verticillata from its close relative, Dimargaris cristalligena, which bears larger sporophores.

== Ecology and distribution ==
Since first discovered, D. verticillata has been known to parasitize the fungus Cokeromyces recurvatus. Later studies have shown that many other fungi may be susceptible to D. verticillata parasitism, such as Mucor spp., Mortierella alpina, and Rhizopus stolonifer.

In addition to California, D. verticillata has also been reported in Middlesex, England.
