= Chlorsulfuron =

ALS inhibitor herbicide

Names
- Preferred IUPAC name 2-Chloro-N-[(4-methoxy-6-methyl-1,3,5-triazin-2-yl)carbamoyl]benzene-1-sulfonamide
- Other names DPX4189

Identifiers
CAS Number	64902-72-3
3D model (JSmol)	Interactive image
ChEBI	CHEBI:3652
ChEMBL	ChEMBL1229721
ChemSpider	43209
ECHA InfoCard	100.059.316
EC Number	265-268-5
KEGG	C05071
PubChem CID	47491
UNII	O6S620ML45
UN number	3077 2588
CompTox Dashboard (EPA)	DTXSID7023980
- InChI: InChI=1S/C12H12ClN5O4S/c1-7-14-10(17-12(15-7)22-2)16-11(19)18-23(20,21)9-6-4-3-5-8(9)13/h3-6H,1-2H3,(H2,14,15,16,17,18,19) Key: VJYIFXVZLXQVHO-UHFFFAOYSA-N
- SMILES: CC1=NC(=NC(=N1)OC)NC(=O)NS(=O)(=O)C2=CC=CC=C2Cl

Properties
Chemical formula	C_{12}H_{12}ClO_{4}S
Molar mass	287.73 g·mol^{−1}
Appearance	White crystalline solid
Density	1.48 g/cm^{3}
Melting point	173 °C (343 °F; 446 K)
Solubility in water	12500 mg/L (20 °C)
log P	2.00 (Ribo, JM, 1988)
Acidity (pK_{a})	3.4

Hazards
- GHS labelling
Pictograms	(GHS09: Environmental hazard)
Signal word	Warning
Hazard statements	H410
Precautionary statements	P273, P391, P501
- Except where otherwise noted, data are given for materials in their standard state (at 25 °C [77 °F], 100 kPa). Infobox references

Chlorsulfuron is an ALS (acetolactate synthase) inhibitor herbicide, and is a sulfonylurea compound. It was discovered by George Levitt in February 1976 while working at DuPont, which was the patent assignee.

It is also registered in South Africa.

== Brand names ==
Originally introduced in 1982 under the brand name Glean by DuPont, later also as Telar, in North America.

== Chemistry ==
The first synthesis of chlorsulfuron was disclosed in a patent filed by the American chemical company DuPont in 1977. 2-Chlorobenzenesulfonyl isocyanate was condensed with 2-amino-4-methoxy-6-methyl-1,3,5-triazine to form the sulfonylurea product.

== Mode of action ==
Chlorsulfuron is an herbicide of the acetolactate synthase inhibitor (ALS inhibitor) class, HRAC (Herbicide Resistance Action Committee) Group 2 (Legacy Group B, Australian Group B).

== Efficacy ==
Triticum aestivum is naturally resistant via aryl hydroxylation then conjugation with glucose compounds into non-herbicidal conjugates. Widespread weed resistance to chlorsulfuron has been found across North America and around the world. T. aestivum's close relative Lolium rigidum was found to be using the same mechanism by Christopher et al 1991 and Cotterman & Saari 1992. A North American population of Stellaria media was found by Hall and Devine 1990 to be resistant by way of an ALS target mutation rather than by improved disposal. Increased P450 activity can also be effective, such as in Alopecurus myosuroides (found by Letouzé and Gasquez 2003), and L. rigidum (by Tardif and Powles 1999). Another such mechanism - the acetolactate synthase target-site mutation Pro-197–Ser - was found by Roux et al 2004 to be accompanied by a 37% recessive fitness cost in a model (Arabidopsis thaliana).

Most varieties of wheat are tolerant to chlorsulfuron even at triple the recommended rate, unlike triple-rate trifluralin and pendimethalin that torpedoed emergence rates across the board, though final crop yields were never as affected as initial emergence. None though significantly affected emergence at normal rates.

== Use in genetic engineering ==
Genes conveying resistance to chlorsulfuron are used as selectable markers when attempting transformation with other genes, for example in Dianthus caryophyllus and Marchantia polymorpha.

Crops have also been deliberately made resistant, for example in maize/corn by McCabe et al 1988 using bombardment with the relevant gene attached to tungsten particles.

== Applications ==
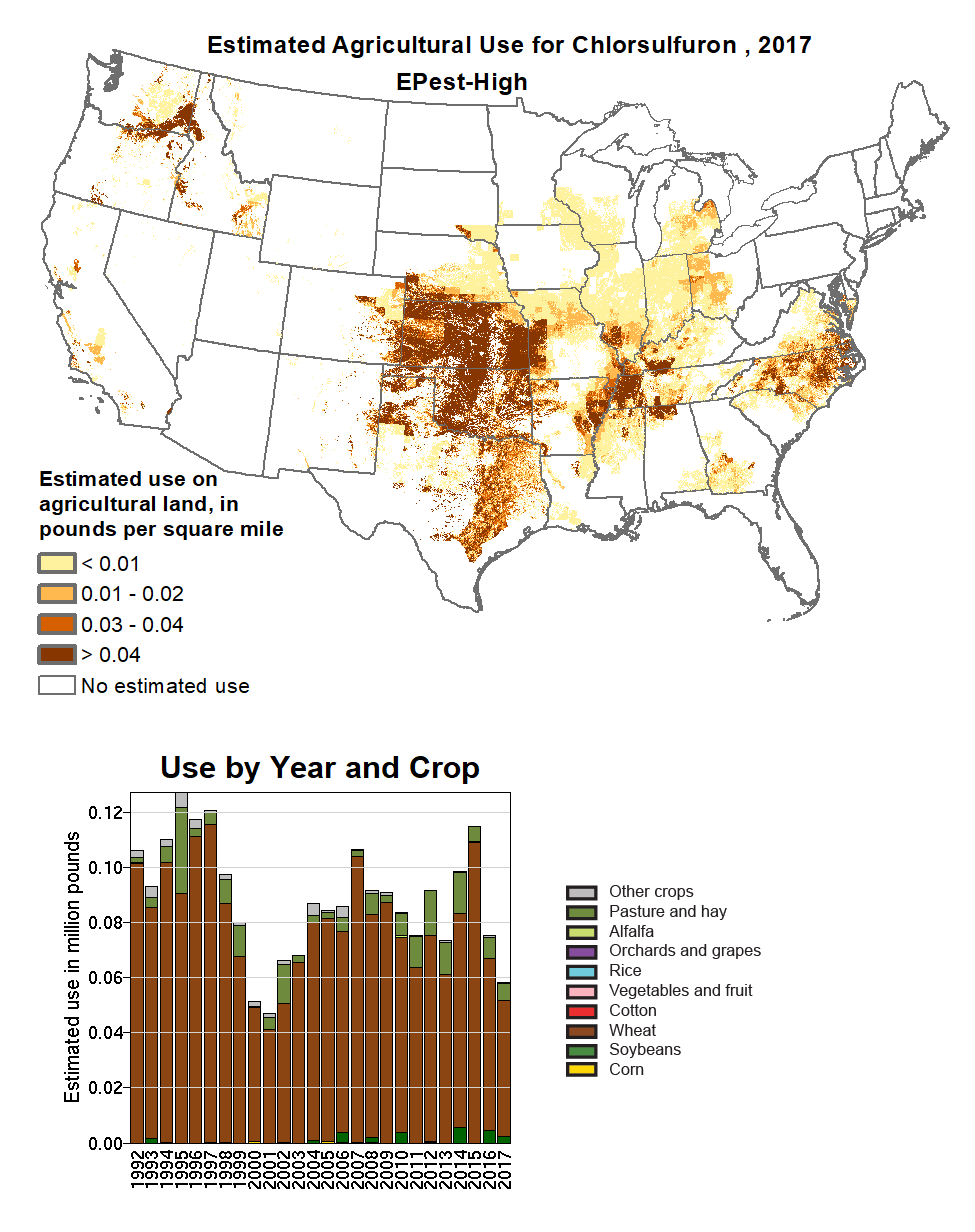
US Geological Survey estimate of chlorsulfuron use in the USA to 2017

Chlorsulfuron has a broad spectrum of activity on commercially important broadleaf weeds and grasses but at the recommended use rate it is safe to important crops such as wheat. Its properties mean that it can be applied to soil so emerging weeds take it up and are controlled. Alternatively, spraying after weeds are already present in the crop will also lead to control. The product is used at application rates of 0.008–0.0155 pounds per acre (9.0–17.4 g/ha). The estimated use in US agriculture is mapped by the US Geological Service and shows that from 1992 to 2017, the latest date for which figures are available, up to 120,000 pounds (54,000 kg) were applied each year. The compound is used mainly in wheat but also in pasture.

Chlorsulfuron is recommended alone or with aminocyclopyrachlor for control of Centaurea solstitialis, Centaurea calcitrapa, and Centaurea iberica in the Pacific Northwest of North America.
