= Harpella =

Harpella may refer to:

- Harpella (fungus), a fungus genus in the family Harpellaceae
- Harpella (gastropod), an extinct marine gastropod genus
- Harpella (moth), a moth genus in the family Oecophorinae
