= P. pastoris =

P. pastoris may refer to:

- Pichia pastoris, a methylotrophic yeast species
- Potthastia pastoris, a midge species found in Europe
- Prosthechea pastoris, an orchid species in the genus Prosthechea
