= Arctodiamesa =

Scientific classification
- Kingdom: Animalia
- Phylum: Arthropoda
- Class: Insecta
- Order: Diptera
- Family: Chironomidae
- Tribe: Diamesini
- Genus: Arctodiamesa; Makarchenko, 1983

Type species
- Diamesa appendiculata Lundström, 1915

Species
- See text

Genus of flies

Arctodiamesa is a genus of non-biting midges in the subfamily Diamesinae of the bloodworm family Chironomidae.

== Species ==
The genus includes the following species:

- A. amurensis Makarchenko, 2007
- A. appendiculata (Lundström, 1915)
- A. breviramosa Makarchenko, 1995
- A. marinae Makarchenko, 2005
