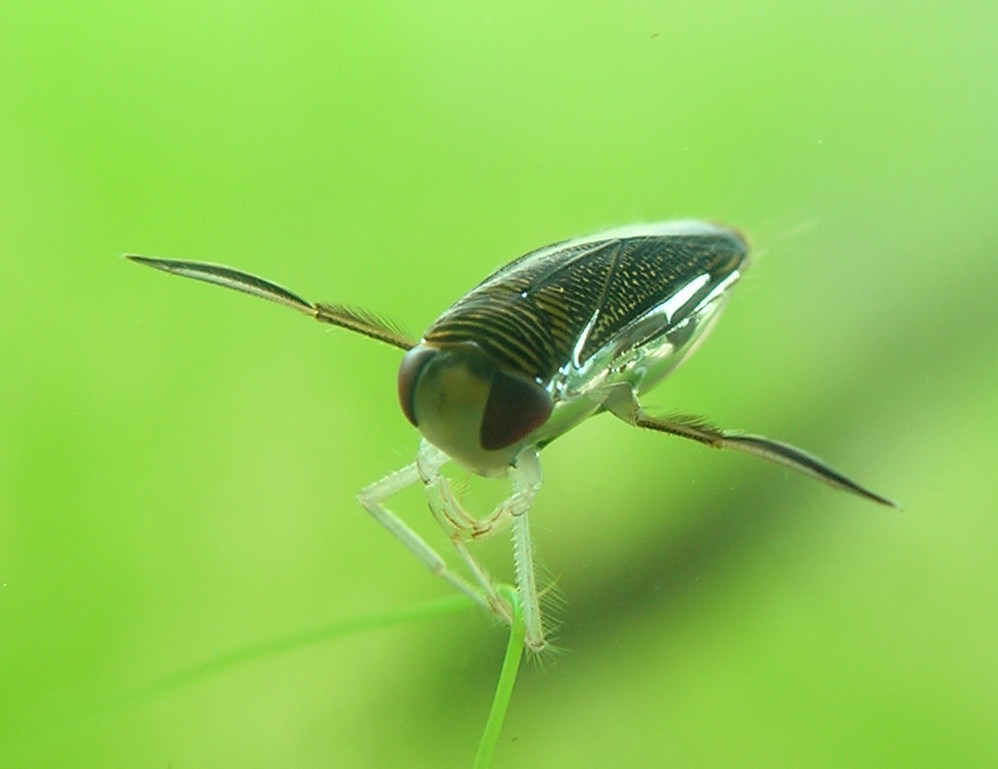
- Corixa punctata

Scientific classification
- Domain: Eukaryota
- Kingdom: Animalia
- Phylum: Arthropoda
- Class: Insecta
- Order: Hemiptera
- Suborder: Heteroptera
- Family: Corixidae
- Subfamily: Corixinae
- Genus: Corixa; Geoffroy, 1762

Species
- Corixa affinis; Corixa dentipes; Corixa iberica; Corixa panzeri; Corixa punctata; fossil species: †Corixa elegans von Schlechtendal, 1894; †Corixa parvoculata Zhang, 1989; †Corixa triquetra Zhang, 1989

Synonyms
- Corisa

= Corixa =

Corixa Temporal range: 28.4–23.03 Ma

Genus of true bugs

Corixa is a genus of aquatic bugs in the family Corixidae. The fossil species C. elegans is from the Rott Formation in Nordrhein-Westfalen (Oligocene of Germany).
