= Boreoheptagyia =

Scientific classification
- Domain: Eukaryota
- Kingdom: Animalia
- Phylum: Arthropoda
- Class: Insecta
- Order: Diptera
- Family: Chironomidae
- Subfamily: Diamesinae
- Genus: Boreoheptagyia; Brundin, 1966

Genus of flies

Boreoheptagyia is a genus of non-biting midges in the subfamily Diamesinae of the bloodworm family Chironomidae.

== Species ==
- B. alpicola Serra-Tosio, 1989
- B. alulasetosa Makarchenko Wu & Wang, 2008
- B. ambigua Makarchenko Wu & Wang, 2008
- B. brevitarsis (Tokunaga, 1936)
- B. cinctipes (Edwards, 1928)
- B. dasyops Serra-Tosio, 1989
- B. kurobebrevis (Sasa & Okazawa, 1992)
- B. legeri (Goetghebuer, 1933)
- B. lurida (Garrett, 1925)
- B. monticola (Serra-Tosio, 1964)
- B. nepalensis Makarchenko & Endo, 2008
- B. phoenicia Moubayed, 1993
- B. rotunda Serra-tosio, 1983
- B. rugosa (Saunders, 1930)
- B. sasai Makarchenko & Endo, 2008
- B. similis (Chaudhuri & Ghosh, 1981)
- B. tibetica Makarchenko & Wang, 1996
- B. unica Makarchenko, 1994
- B. xinglongiensis Makarchenko Wu & Wang, 2008
