= Eukiefferiella busanensis =

Scientific classification
- Kingdom: Animalia
- Phylum: Arthropoda
- Class: Insecta
- Order: Diptera
- Family: Chironomidae
- Genus: Eukiefferiella
- Species: E. busanensis

Binomial name
- Eukiefferiella busanensis Ree, 2012

Species of fly

Eukiefferiella busanensis is a species of non-biting midge in the bloodworm family Chironomidae.

It was first described in 2012 by Han Il Ree, with the species epithet, busanensis, which describes it as coming from Busan.

This midge is endemic to Korea, where it is seen in autumn in the swamps of the Nakdong River estuary.
