= Pagastia =

Scientific classification
- Domain: Eukaryota
- Kingdom: Animalia
- Phylum: Arthropoda
- Class: Insecta
- Order: Diptera
- Family: Chironomidae
- Tribe: Diamesini
- Genus: Pagastia; Oliver, 1959

Species
- See text

Genus of flies

Pagastia is a genus of non-biting midges in the subfamily Diamesinae of the bloodworm family Chironomidae.

== Species ==
The genus includes the following species:

- P. sequax (Garrett, 1925)
- P. altaica Makarchenko Kerkis & Ivanchenko, 1997
- P. lanceolata (Tokunaga, 1936)
- P. nivis (Tokunaga, 1936)
- P. orientalis (Tshernovskij, 1949)
- P. orthogonia Oliver, 1959
- P. partica (Roback, 1957)
