= Pseudodiamesa =

Scientific classification
- Domain: Eukaryota
- Kingdom: Animalia
- Phylum: Arthropoda
- Class: Insecta
- Order: Diptera
- Family: Chironomidae
- Tribe: Diamesini
- Genus: Pseudodiamesa; Goetghebuer, 1939

Species
- See text

Genus of flies

Pseudodiamesa is a genus of non-biting midges in the subfamily Diamesinae of the bloodworm family Chironomidae.

== Species ==
The genus includes the following species:

- P. arctica (Malloch, 1919)
- P. branickii (Nowicki, 1837)
- P. latistyla Makarchenko, 1989
- P. nivosa (Goetghebuer, 1932)
- P. pertinax (Garrett, 1925)
- P. stackelbergi (Goetghebuer, 1933)
