= Protanypus =

Scientific classification
- Domain: Eukaryota
- Kingdom: Animalia
- Phylum: Arthropoda
- Class: Insecta
- Order: Diptera
- Family: Chironomidae
- Subfamily: Diamesinae
- Tribe: Protanypini
- Genus: Protanypus; Kieffer, 1906

Synonyms
- Didiamesa Kieffer, 1924

Genus of flies

Protanypus is a genus of non-biting midges in the subfamily Diamesinae. There are about 10 described species in Protanypus, found in Europe, North America, and Asia.

== Species ==
These 10 species belong to the genus Protanypus:

- Protanypus caudatus Edwards, 1924 (Europe)
- Protanypus forcipatus (Egger, 1864) (Europe)
- Protanypus gracilis Makarchenko, 1982
- Protanypus hamiltoni Saether, 1975
- Protanypus inateuus Sasa, Kitami & Suzuki, 2001
- Protanypus morio (Zetterstedt, 1838) (Europe)
- Protanypus pseudomorio Makarchenko, 1982
- Protanypus ramosus Saether, 1975
- Protanypus saetheri Wiederholm, 1975
- Protanypus tshereshnevi Makarchenko, 1982
