= Lappodiamesa =

Scientific classification
- Domain: Eukaryota
- Kingdom: Animalia
- Phylum: Arthropoda
- Class: Insecta
- Order: Diptera
- Family: Chironomidae
- Tribe: Diamesini
- Genus: Lappodiamesa; Serra-Tosio, 1968

Species
- See text

Genus of flies

Lappodiamesa is a genus of non-biting midges in the subfamily Diamesinae of the bloodworm family Chironomidae.

== Species ==
The genus includes the following species:

- L. multiseta Makarchenko, 1995
- L. vidua (Kieffer, 1922)
- L. willasseni Makarchenko et Kerkis, 1991
