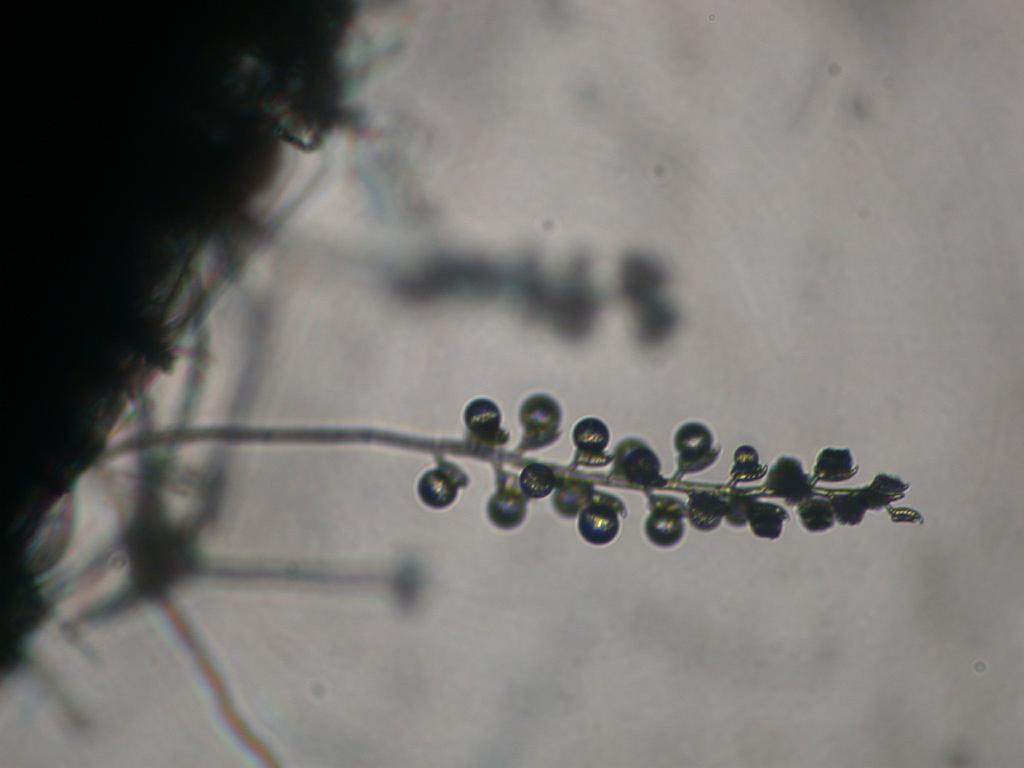
- Coemansia sp. perhaps C. erecta

Scientific classification
- Domain: Eukaryota
- Kingdom: Fungi
- Division: Kickxellomycota
- Class: Kickxellomycetes
- Order: Kickxellales
- Family: Kickxellaceae
- Genus: Coemansia; Tiegh. & Le Monn. (1873)

Type species
- Coemansia reversa Tiegh. & G.Le Monn. (1873)

= Coemansia =

Genus of fungi

Coemansia is a genus of fungi in the family Kickxellaceae. It was circumscribed in 1873.

The genus name of Coemansia is in honour of Henri Eugène Lucien Gaëtan Coemans (1825-1871), a Belgian clergyman and botanist (Mycology), worked in Ghent.

== Species ==
- Coemansia aciculifera
- Coemansia alma-atensis
- Coemansia asiatica
- Coemansia bainieri
- Coemansia brasiliensis
- Coemansia breviramosa
- Coemansia ceylonensis
- Coemansia erecta
- Coemansia furcata
- Coemansia guatemalensis
- Coemansia interrupta
- Coemansia javaensis
- Coemansia kamerunensis
- Coemansia linderi
- Coemansia mojavensis
- Coemansia nantahalensis
- Coemansia pectinata
- Coemansia reversa
- Coemansia scorpioidea
- Coemansia spiralis
- Coemansia thaxteri
