= Legeriomycetaceae =

Scientific classification
- Kingdom: Fungi
- Division: Kickxellomycota
- Class: Harpellomycetes
- Order: Harpellales
- Family: Legeriomycetaceae; Pouzar (1972)

Type genus
- Legeriomyces Pouzar (1972)

Family of fungi

The Legeriomycetaceae are a family of fungi in the Harpellales order. The family contains 31 genera and 158 species.

== Genera ==
- Allantomyces
- Austrosmittium
- Baetimyces
- Barbatospora
- Bojamyces
- Capniomyces
- Caudomyces
- Coleopteromyces
- Ejectosporus
- Furculomyces
- Gauthieromyces
- Genistelloides
- Genistellospora
- Glotzia
- Graminella
- Graminelloides
- Lancisporomyces
- Legerioides
- Legeriomyces
- Legeriosimilis
- Orphella
- Pennella
- Plecopteromyces
- Pteromaktron
- Simuliomyces
- Smittium
- Spartiella
- Stipella
- Tectimyces
- Trichozygospora
- Zygopolaris
