= Corixa dentipes =

Scientific classification
- Domain: Eukaryota
- Kingdom: Animalia
- Phylum: Arthropoda
- Class: Insecta
- Order: Hemiptera
- Suborder: Heteroptera
- Family: Corixidae
- Genus: Corixa
- Species: C. dentipes

Binomial name
- Corixa dentipes (Thomson, 1869)

Species of true bug

Corixa dentipes is a species of water boatman in the family Corixidae in the order Hemiptera.
