= Corixa affinis =

Scientific classification
- Domain: Eukaryota
- Kingdom: Animalia
- Phylum: Arthropoda
- Class: Insecta
- Order: Hemiptera
- Suborder: Heteroptera
- Family: Corixidae
- Genus: Corixa
- Species: C. affinis

Binomial name
- Corixa affinis Leach, 1817

Species of true bug

Corixa affinis is a species of water boatman in the family Corixidae in the order Hemiptera.
