= Syndiamesa =

Scientific classification
- Domain: Eukaryota
- Kingdom: Animalia
- Phylum: Arthropoda
- Class: Insecta
- Order: Diptera
- Family: Chironomidae
- Tribe: Diamesini
- Genus: Syndiamesa; Kieffer, 1918

Species
- See text

Genus of flies

Syndiamesa is a genus of non-biting midges in the subfamily Diamesinae of the bloodworm family Chironomidae.

== Species ==
The genus includes the following species:

- S. edwardsi (Pagast, 1947)
- S. hygropetrica (Kieffer, 1909)
- S. mira (Makarchenko, 1980)
- S. nigra Rossaro, 1980
- S. serratosioi Kownacki, 1981
- S. yosiii Tokunaga, 1964
