= Jean Kickx =

Belgian botanist (1803-1864)

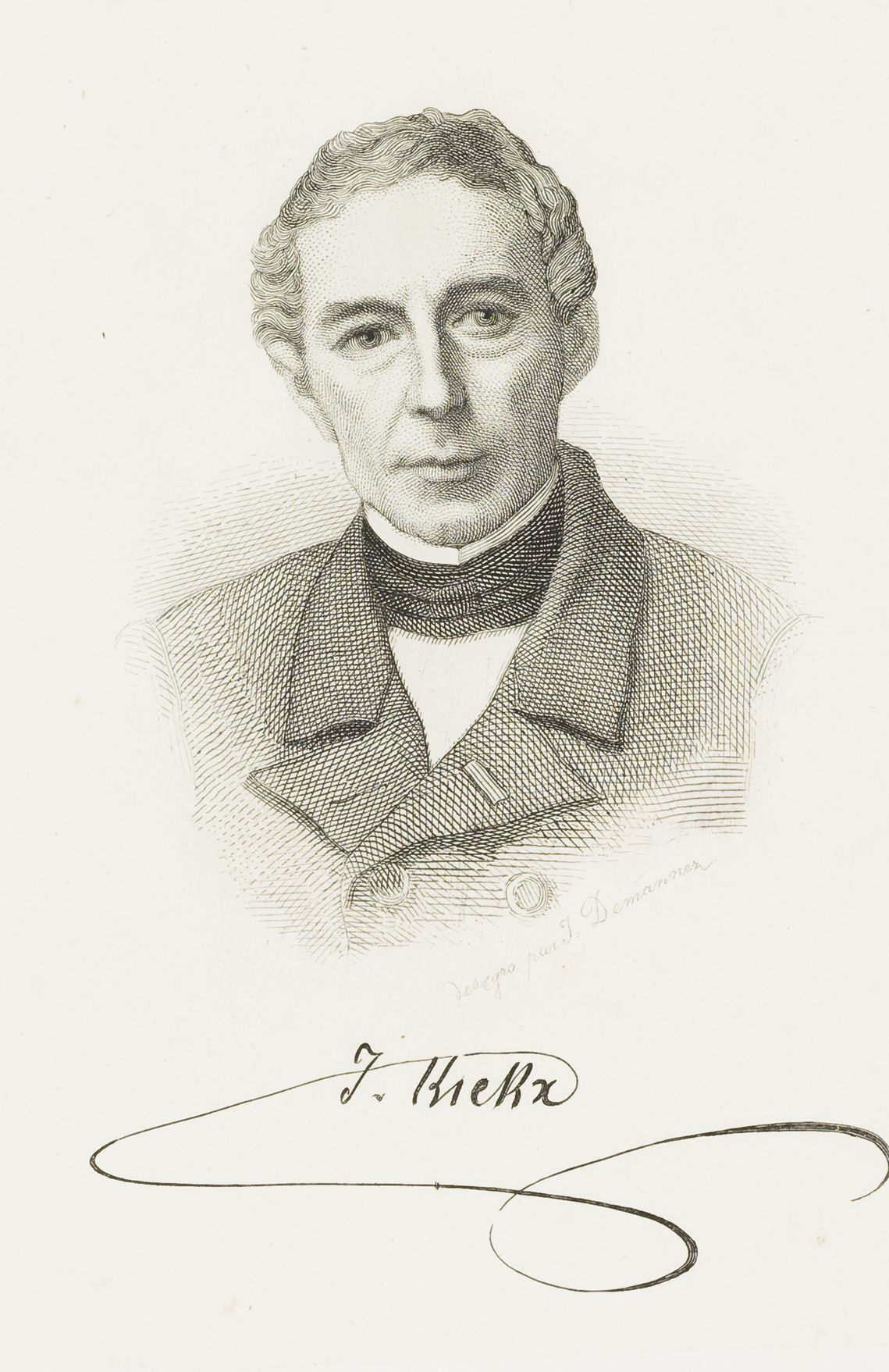
Jean Kickx (1803–1864)

Jean Kickx (17 January 1803, Brussels – 1864) was a Belgian botanist. His father, also known as Jean Kickx (1775–1831) was a botanist and mineralogist; his son Jean Jacques Kickx (1842–1887) was a professor of botany at the University of Ghent.

In 1830 he obtained his PhD at Leuven, later serving as a professor of botany in Brussels (1831–1835) and at the University of Ghent (1835–1864). He was a co-founder of the Société royale de botanique de Belgique.

The mycological genus Kickxella (order Kickxellales) was named in his honor by Eugène Coumans.

== Published works ==
He was the author of a treatise on cryptogamic flora native to Flanders that was issued after his death by his son as Flore Cryptogamique des Flandre (1867). In the field of malacology, he published Specimen inaugurale exhibens synopsin molluscorum Brabantiæ Australi indigenorum (with Francis Joseph Adelmann, 1830). Other noteworthy written works by Kickx include:

- Flore cryptogamique des environs de Louvain, ou, Description des plantes cryptogames et agames qui croissent dans le brabant et dans une partie de la province d'Anvers, 1835 - Cryptogams found in the vicinity of Louvain, etc.
- Notice sur quelques champignons du Mexique, 1841 - Notice involving some mushrooms of Mexico.
