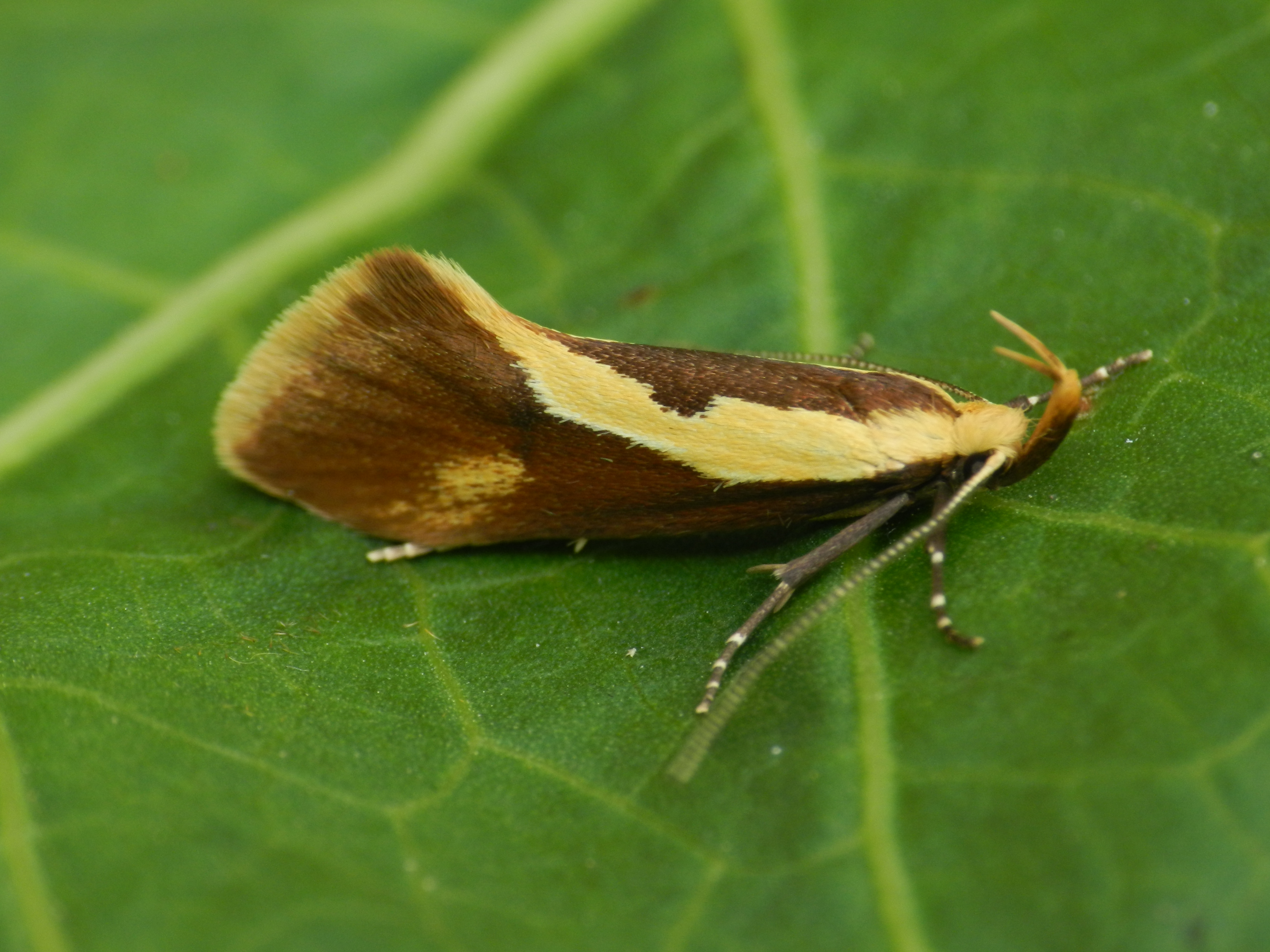
- Harpella forficella. Side view
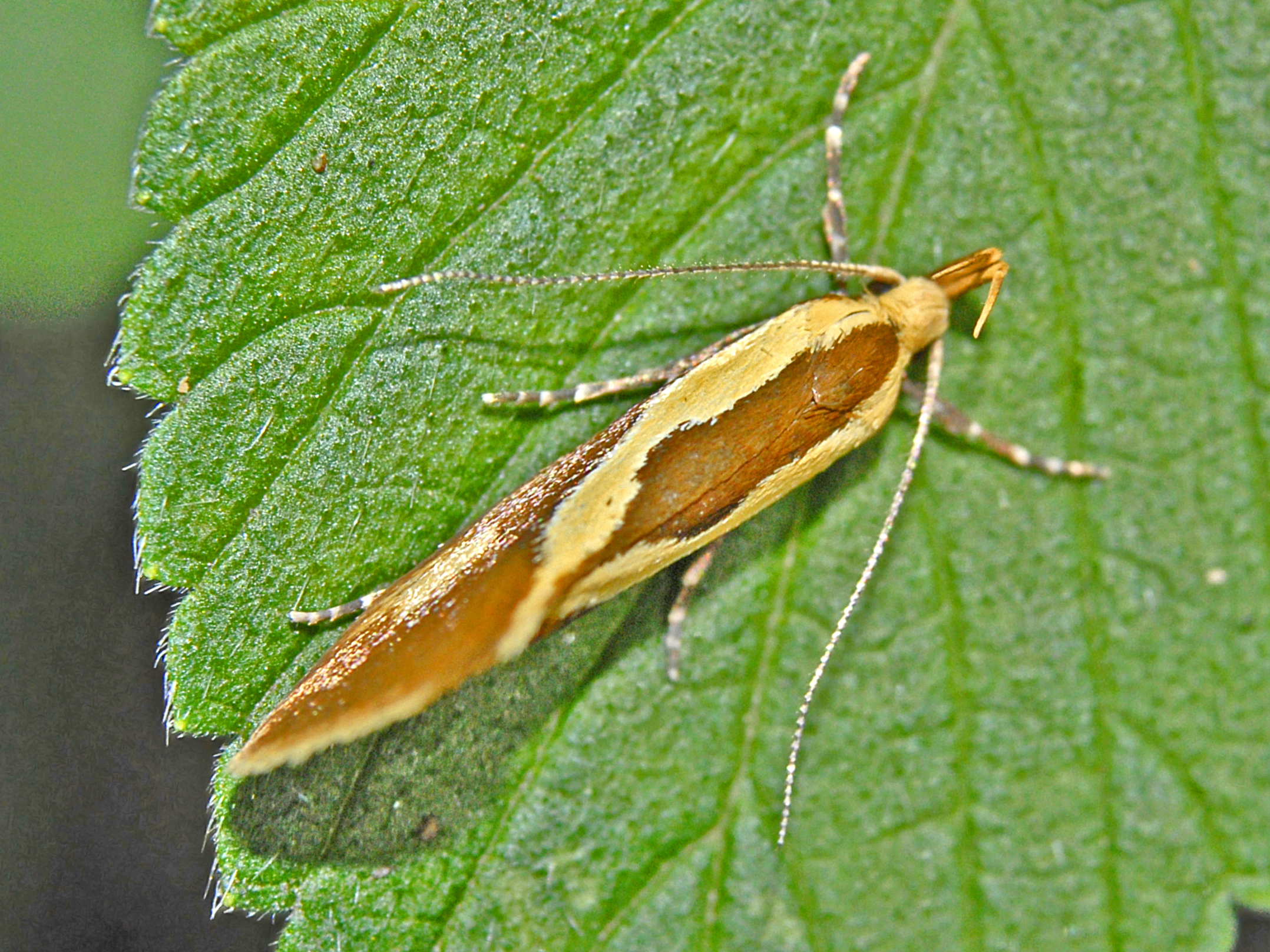
- Dorsal view

Scientific classification
- Kingdom: Animalia
- Phylum: Arthropoda
- Clade: Pancrustacea
- Class: Insecta
- Order: Lepidoptera
- Family: Oecophoridae
- Genus: Harpella
- Species: H. forficella

Binomial name
- Harpella forficella (Scopoli, 1763)

Synonyms
- Tinea majorella Denis & Schiffermuller, 1775; Phalaena proboscidella Sulzer, 1776; Harpella aerisell< Caradja, 1920

= Harpella forficella =

Species of moth

Harpella forficella is a species of the concealer moth family (Oecophoridae), wherein it belongs to subfamily Oecophorinae.

== Distribution ==
This species can be found in most of Europe and in the Near East.

== Habitat ==
These moths inhabit deciduous forests, especially on hedge rows and sandy soils.

== Description ==
Harpella forficella has a wingspan of 19–29 mm. These moths have a brown-yellow wing pattern, which is only slightly variable. They have conspicuously long, upturned palps. The caterpillars are light gray and have gray spots and dark hairy warts. Head and neck shield are brown.

== Biology ==
The adults fly from June to September, depending on the location. They rarely come to light and sometimes fly during the day. The females lay eggs from late summer until autumn on the trunks of trees. The caterpillars live singly or in small groups on decayed wood, under bark, from September and hibernate till next spring. They feed on fungus mycelia on dead wood and take two years to develop. They have also been recorded to eat the sac fungus King Alfred's cake (Daldinia concentrica).
