= Eukiefferiella brevicalcar =

Scientific classification
- Kingdom: Animalia
- Phylum: Arthropoda
- Class: Insecta
- Order: Diptera
- Family: Chironomidae
- Genus: Eukiefferiella
- Species: E. brevicalcar

Binomial name
- Eukiefferiella brevicalcar (Kieffer, 1911)

Synonyms
- Dactylocladius brevicalcar Kieffer, 1911; Spaniotoma ( Eukiefferiella ) brevicalcar (Kieffer, 1911); Eukiefferiella suecica Goetghebuer, 1940; Eukiefferiella graciliella Goetghebuer, 1936} Dactylocladius rhabani Kieffer, 1923} Dactylocladius ampullaceus Kieffer, 1911} Dactylocladius pallidipes Kieffer, 1911

Species of fly

Eukiefferiella brevicalcar is a species of non-biting midge in the bloodworm family Chironomidae.

It was first described as Dactylocladius brevicalcar in 1911 by Jean-Jacques Kieffer. Numerous synonyms are given in the Catalogue of Life record for this midge, but the sources for these synonymisations are not given.

This midge is found on all continents of the northern hemisphere (and in Korea).
