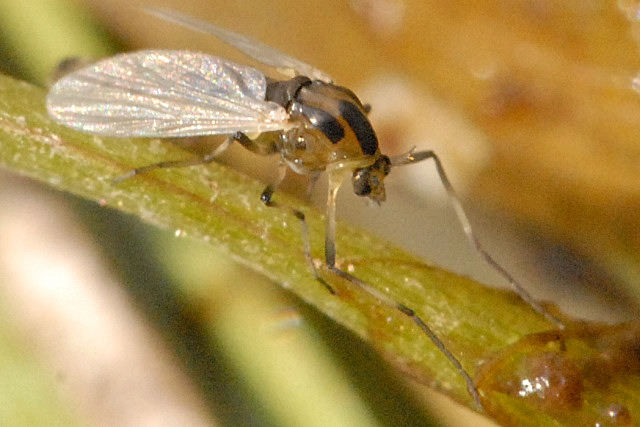
- Potthastia gaedii

Scientific classification
- Kingdom: Animalia
- Phylum: Arthropoda
- Clade: Pancrustacea
- Class: Insecta
- Order: Diptera
- Family: Chironomidae
- Subfamily: Diamesinae; Kieffer, 1922

Tribes and genera
- See text

= Diamesinae =

Subfamily of insects

Diamesinae is a subfamily of midges in the non-biting midge family (Chironomidae).

== Tribes and genera ==
- Tribe Boreoheptagyiini Brundin, 1966
  - Genus Boreoheptagyia Brundin, 1966
  - Genus Kaluginia Fossil
- Tribe Diamesini Pagast, 1947
  - Genus Arctodiamesa Makarchenko, 1983
  - Genus Diamesa Meigen in Gistl, 1835
  - Genus Lappodiamesa Serra-Tosio, 1968
  - Genus Pagastia Oliver, 1959
  - Genus Potthastia Kieffer, 1922
  - Genus Pseudodiamesa Goetghebuer, 1939
  - Genus Sympotthastia Pagast, 1947
  - Genus Syndiamesa Kieffer, 1918
- Tribe Protanypini Brundin, 1956
  - Genus Protanypus Kieffer, 1906
- †tribe Cretodiamesini Kalugina 1976
  - Genus †Cretodiamesa Kalugina 1976 Taimyr amber, Russia, Santonian
- †tribe Eugenodiamesini Lukashevich and Przhiboro 2015
  - Genus †Eugenodiamesa Lukashevich and Przhiboro 2015 Tsagaantsav Formation, Mongolia, Early Cretaceous
