= Eukiefferiella devonica =

Scientific classification
- Kingdom: Animalia
- Phylum: Arthropoda
- Class: Insecta
- Order: Diptera
- Family: Chironomidae
- Genus: Eukiefferiella
- Species: E. devonica

Binomial name
- Eukiefferiella devonica (Edwards, 1929)

Genus of flies

Eukiefferiella devonica is a species of non-biting midges in the subfamily Orthocladiinae of the bloodworm family Chironomidae.
