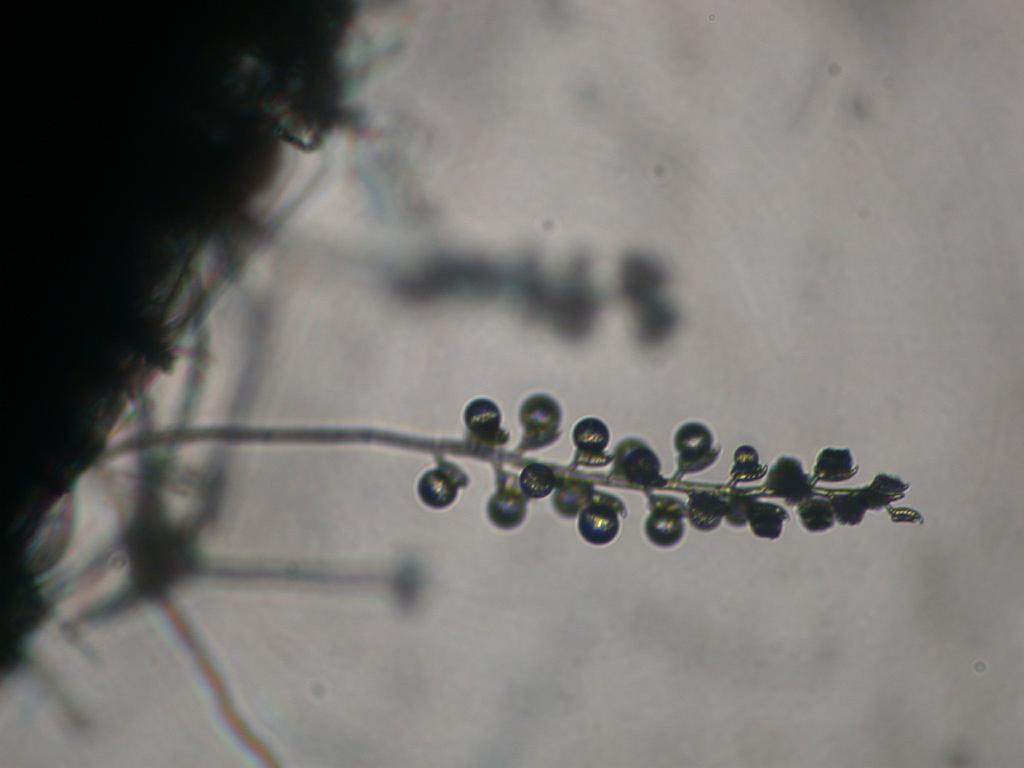
- Coemansia sp. perhaps C. electa

Scientific classification
- Kingdom: Fungi
- Division: Kickxellomycota
- Class: Kickxellomycetes
- Order: Kickxellales; Kreisel ex R.K.Benj.
- Family: Kickxellaceae; Linder

Type genus
- Kickxella Coem.

= Kickxellaceae =

Order of fungi

The Kickxellales are an order of fungi classified under Kickxellomycotina. It contains the single family Kickxellaceae, which contains roughly 37 species as of 2014.

It is not monophyletic.

Fungi of this order are rarely encountered; they are usually saprotrophic, coprophilus, or rarely mycoparasitic. Most species release their spores in a droplet of fluid upon reaching maturity.

== Genera ==
- Coemansia
- Dipsacomyces
- Kickxella
- Linderina
- Martensella
- Martensiomyces
- Mycoemilia
- Myconymphaea
- Pinnaticoemansia
- Ramicandelaber
- Spirodactylon
- Spiromyces
