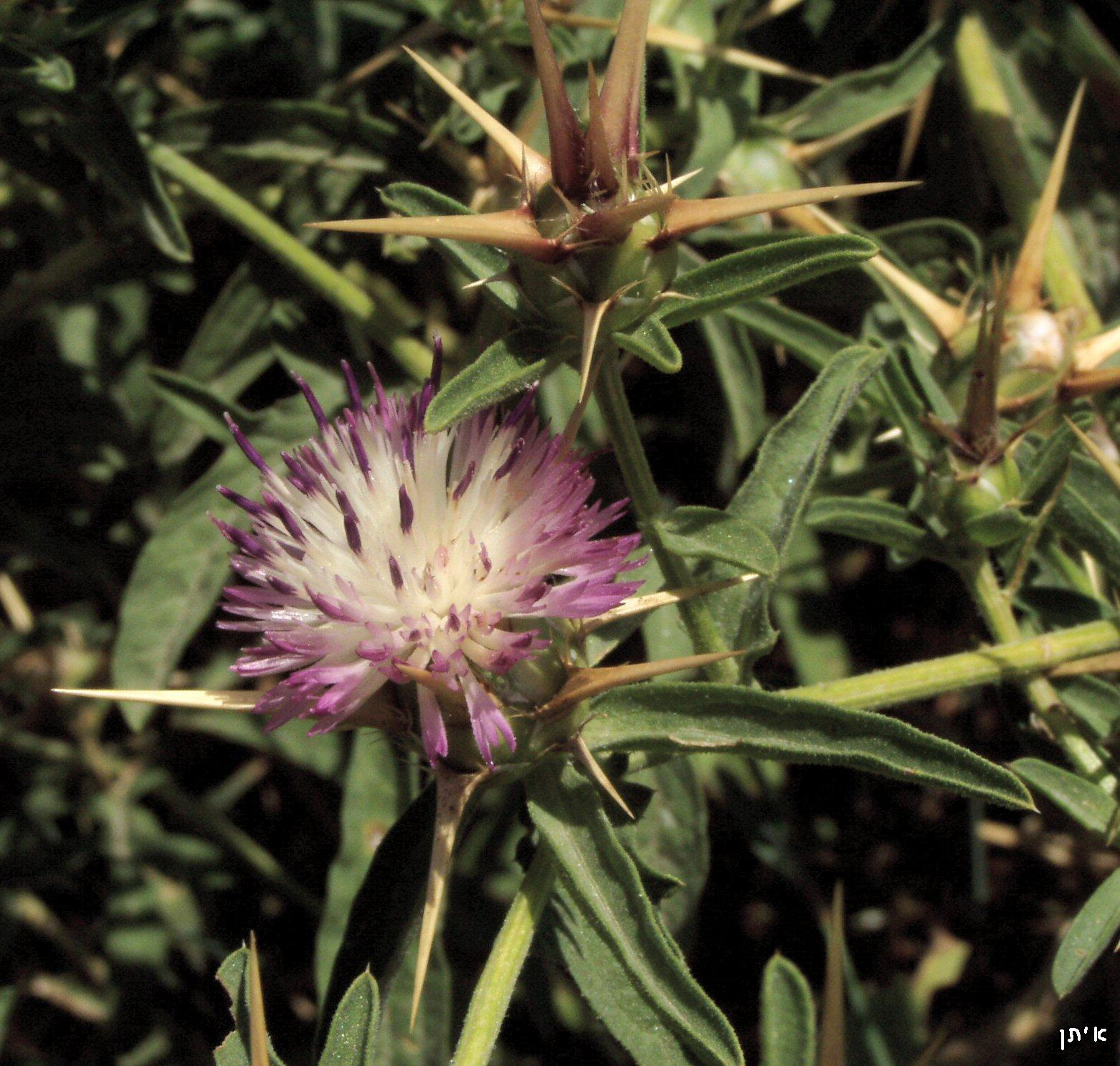

Scientific classification
- Kingdom: Plantae
- Clade: Tracheophytes
- Clade: Angiosperms
- Clade: Eudicots
- Clade: Asterids
- Order: Asterales
- Family: Asteraceae
- Genus: Centaurea
- Species: C. iberica

Binomial name
- Centaurea iberica Trevir. & Spreng.

= Centaurea iberica =

Species of flowering plant

Centaurea iberica, the Iberian knapweed or Iberian star-thistle, is a species of Centaurea. It is native to southeastern Europe and southwestern Asia. It is known elsewhere as an introduced species and a noxious weed.

== Control ==
Aminocyclopyrachlor + chlorsulfuron, aminopyralid, chlorsulfuron alone, clopyralid, clopyralid + 2,4-Dichlorophenoxyacetic acid, dicamba, diflufenzopyr + dicamba, picloram, and triclopyr + clopyralid for the Pacific Northwest of North America.
