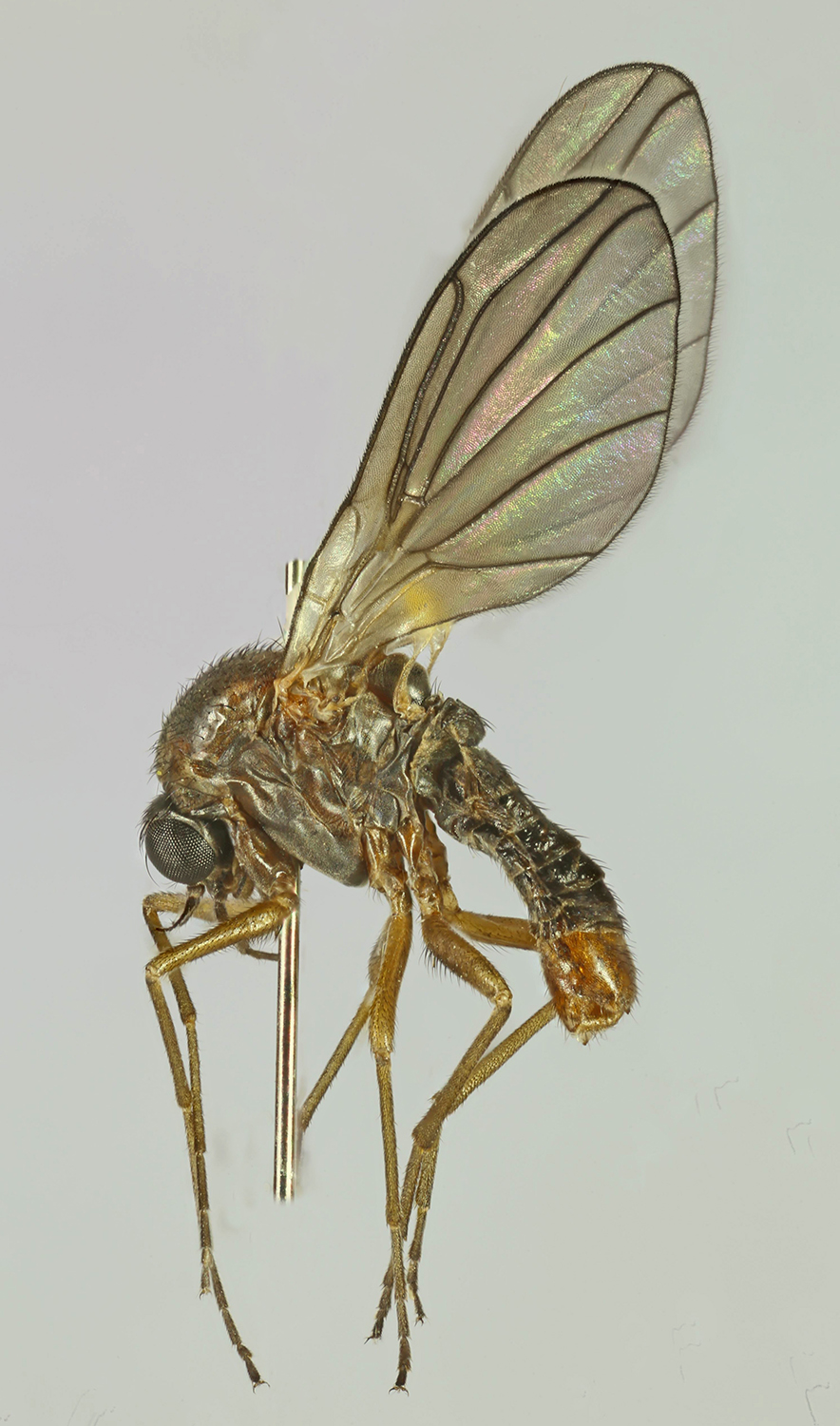
- Thaumalea verralli North Wales

Scientific classification
- Kingdom: Animalia
- Phylum: Arthropoda
- Class: Insecta
- Order: Diptera
- Family: Thaumaleidae
- Genus: Thaumalea
- Species: T. verralli

Binomial name
- Thaumalea verralli Edwards, 1929

= Thaumalea verralli =

Species of fly

Thaumalea verralli is a species of fly in the family Thaumaleidae. It is found in the Palearctic.
