= Diamesa =

Scientific classification
- Domain: Eukaryota
- Kingdom: Animalia
- Phylum: Arthropoda
- Class: Insecta
- Order: Diptera
- Family: Chironomidae
- Subfamily: Diamesinae
- Genus: Diamesa; Meigen in Gistl, 1835

Species
- See text

Synonyms
- Eutanypus Coquillett, 1899

Genus of flies

Diamesa is a genus of non-biting midges in the subfamily Diamesinae of the bloodworm family Chironomidae.

== Species ==
The genus includes the following species:

- D. aberrata Lundbeck, 1898
- D. alata Storå, 1945
- D. alpina Tokunaga, 1936
- D. amanoi Makarchenko & Kobayashi, 1997
- D. amplexivirilia Hansen, 1976
- D. ancysta Roback, 1959
- D. arctica Boheman, 1865
- D. bertrami Edwards, 1935
- D. bohemani Goetghebuer, 1932
- D. cheimatophila Hansen, 1976
- D. chiobates Hansen, 1976
- D. chorea Lundbeck, 1898
- D. cinerella Meigen in Gistl, 1835
- D. clavata Edwards, 1933
- D. colenae Hansen, 1976
- D. dactyloidea Makarchenko, 1988
- D. dampfi Kieffer, 1924
- D. davisi Edwards, 1933
- D. filicauda Tokunaga, 1966
- D. garretti Sublette & Sublette, 1965
- D. geminata Kieffer, 1926
- D. goetghebueri Pagast, 1947
- D. gregsoni Edwards, 1933
- D. hamaticornis Kieffer, 1924
- D. haydaki Hansen, 1976
- D. heteropus Coquillett, 1905
- D. hyperborea Holmgren, 1869
- D. incallida (Walker, 1856)
- D. insignipes Kieffer in Kieffer & Thienemann, 1908
- D. japonica Tokunaga, 1936
- D. kasymovi Kownacki & Kownacka, 1973
- D. laticauda Serra-Tosio, 1964
- D. latitarsis Goetghebuer, 1921
- D. lavillei Serra-Tosio, 1969
- D. leona Roback, 1957
- D. leoniella Hansen, 1976
- D. lindrothi Goetghebuer, 1931
- D. longipes Goetghebuer, 1941
- D. macronyx Kieffer, 1918
- D. martae Kownacki & Kownacka, 1980
- D. mendotae Muttkowski, 1915
- D. modesta Serra-Tosio, 1967
- D. nivicavernicola Hansen, 1976
- D. nivoriunda Fitch, 1847
- D. nowickiana Kownacki & Kownacka, 1975
- D. permacra Walker, 1856
- D. plumicornis Tokunaga, 1936
- D. serratosioi Willassen, 1986
- D. simplex Kieffer, 1926
- D. sommermani Hansen, 1976
- D. spinacies Sæther, 1969
- D. spitzbergensis Kieffer, 1919
- D. starmachi Kownacki & Kownacka, 1970
- D. steinboecki Goetghebuer, 1933
- D. Sætheri Willassen, 1986
- D. tenuipes Goetghebuer, 1938
- D. thomasi Serra-Tosio, 1970
- D. tonsa Haliday in Walker, 1856
- D. tsutsuii Tokunaga, 1936
- D. vaillanti Serra-Tosio, 1972
- D. valkanovi Sæther, 1968
- D. veletensis Serra-Tosio, 1971
- D. vernalis Makarchenko, 1977
- D. vockerothi Hansen, 1976
- D. wuelkeri Serra-Tosio, 1964
- D. zernyi Edwards, 1933
