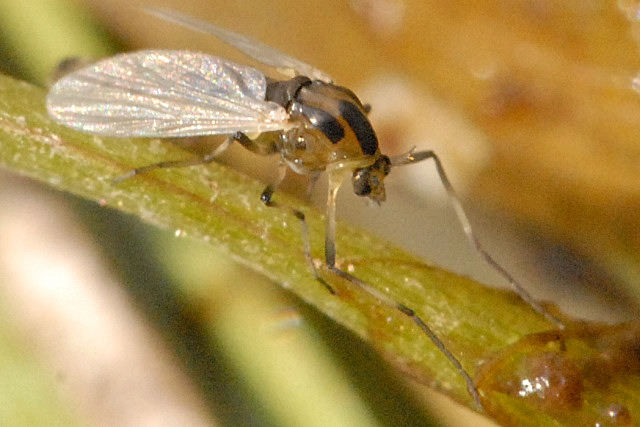
- Potthastia gaedii

Scientific classification
- Kingdom: Animalia
- Phylum: Arthropoda
- Class: Insecta
- Order: Diptera
- Family: Chironomidae
- Subfamily: Diamesinae
- Tribe: Diamesini
- Genus: Potthastia; Kieffer, 1922

Species
- See text

= Potthastia =

Genus of flies

Potthastia is a genus of non-biting midges in the subfamily Diamesinae of the bloodworm family Chironomidae.

== Species ==
The genus includes the following species:

- Potthastia dominicii Moubayed-Breil & Orsini, 2016
- Potthastia gaedii (Meigen, 1838)
- Potthastia giudicellii Moubayed-Breil & Orsini, 2016
- Potthastia iberica Serra-tosio, 1971
- Potthastia longimana Kieffer, 1922
- Potthastia montium (Edwards, 1929)
- Potthastia pastoris (Edwards, 1933)
- Potthastia valserina Moubayed-Breil & Orsini, 2016
