= Diamesa nivoriunda =

Scientific classification
- Kingdom: Animalia
- Phylum: Arthropoda
- Clade: Pancrustacea
- Class: Insecta
- Order: Diptera
- Family: Chironomidae
- Genus: Diamesa
- Species: D. nivoriunda

Binomial name
- Diamesa nivoriunda (Fitch, 1847)

Synonyms
- Chironomus nivoriunda Fitch, 1847; Spaniotoma nivoriunda Fitch, 1847

Species of fly

Diamesa nivoriunda is a species of midge in the family Chironomidae.
