= Sympotthastia =

Scientific classification
- Domain: Eukaryota
- Kingdom: Animalia
- Phylum: Arthropoda
- Class: Insecta
- Order: Diptera
- Family: Chironomidae
- Tribe: Diamesini
- Genus: Sympotthastia; Pagast, 1947

Species
- See text

Genus of flies

Sympotthastia is a genus of non-biting midges in the subfamily Diamesinae of the bloodworm family Chironomidae.

== Species ==
The genus includes the following species:

- S. fulva (Johannsen, 1921)
- S. gemmaformis Makarchenko, 1994
- S. huldeni Tuiskunen, 1986
- S. macrocera Serra-Tosio, 1968
- S. repentina Makarchenko, 1984
- S. spinifera Serra-Tosio, 1968
- S. takatensis (Tokunaga, 1936)
- S. zavreli Pagast, 1947
