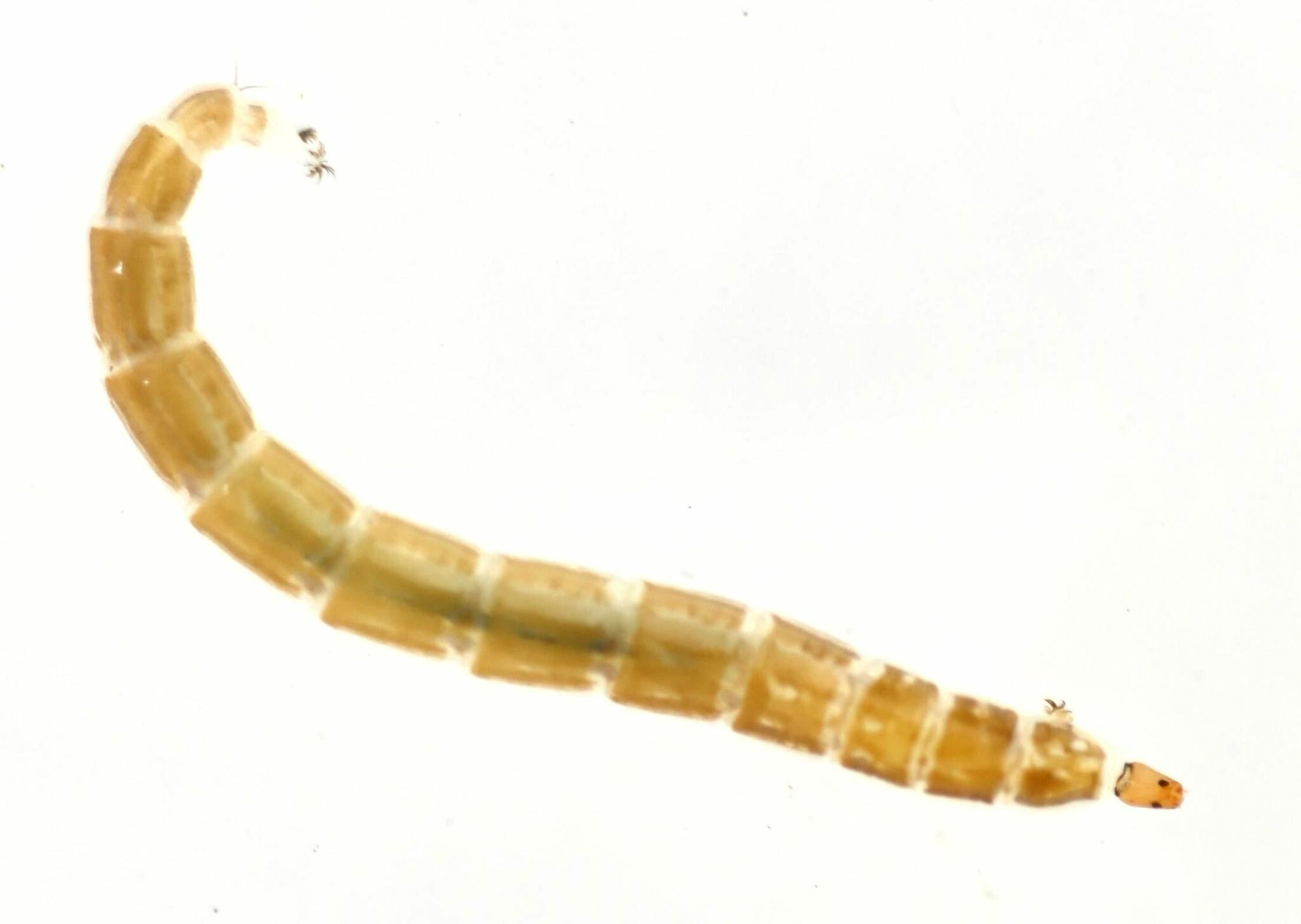
- Larva

Scientific classification
- Kingdom: Animalia
- Phylum: Arthropoda
- Class: Insecta
- Order: Diptera
- Family: Chironomidae
- Genus: Potthastia
- Species: P. longimana

Binomial name
- Potthastia longimana (Kieffer, 1922)

Synonyms
- Diamesa longimana

= Potthastia longimana =

Species of fly

Potthastia longimana is a species of non-biting midge.
