= Jean Kickx (1775–1831) =

Belgian botanist and mineralogist (1775-1831)

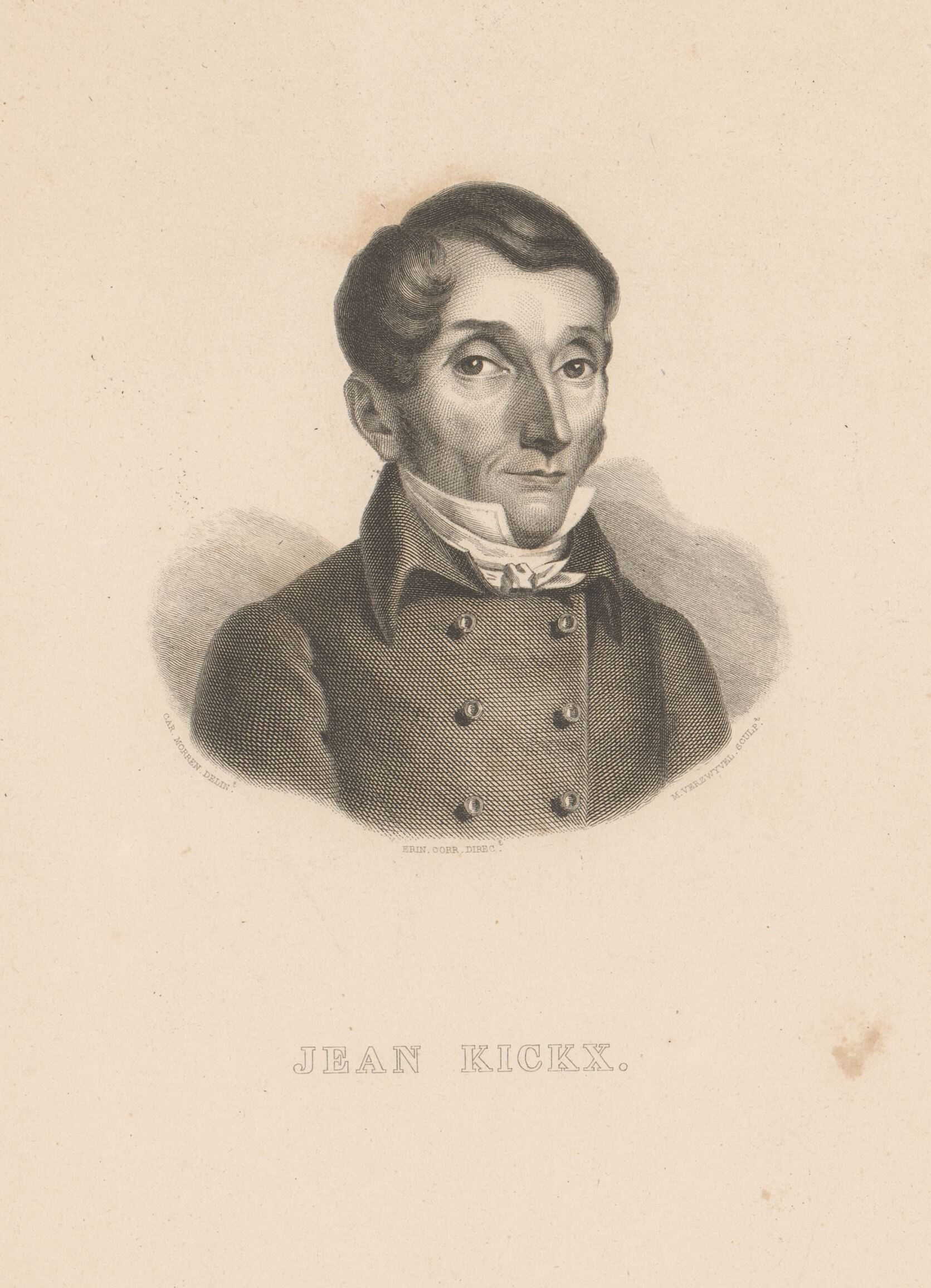
Jean Kickx

Jean Kickx (9 March 1775 in Brussels – 27 March 1831 in Brussels) Son of Jacques Kickx (d. 1802) and Marie van Esschen (d. 1802) was a Belgian botanist and mineralogist. His son Jean Kickx (1803-1864) and grandson Jean Jacques Kickx (1842-1887) both became professors of botany at the University of Ghent.

He worked as a professor of botany, pharmacy and mineralogy in Brussels, becoming a member of the Royal Belgian Academy in 1817. In 1827 Barthélemy Charles Joseph Dumortier named the genus Kickxia (family Plantaginaceae) in his honor.

== Principal works ==
- Flora bruxellensis, exhibens characteres generum et specierum plantarum, 1812.
- Tentamen Mineralogicum: seu mineralium nova distributio in classes, ordines, genera, species, cum varietatibus et synonimis auctorum, cui additur lexicon mineralogicum in quo artis vocabula exponuntur, 1820.
- Accurata descriptio plantarum officinalium et venenatarum tum phanerogamarum tum cryptogamarum, in agro Lovaniensi sponte crescentium, 1827.
