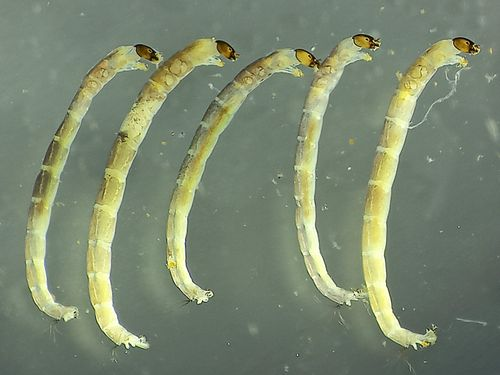
- Eukiefferiella claripennis (larvae)

Scientific classification
- Kingdom: Animalia
- Phylum: Arthropoda
- Class: Insecta
- Order: Diptera
- Family: Chironomidae
- Subfamily: Orthocladiinae
- Genus: Eukiefferiella; Thienemann, 1926

= Eukiefferiella =

Genus of flies

Eukiefferiella is a genus of non-biting midges in the subfamily Orthocladiinae of the bloodworm family (Chironomidae). It has over 50 species worldwide.

The genus was first described in 1926 by August Thienemann.

== Species ==
- Eukiefferiella ancyla Svensson, 1986
- Eukiefferiella bedmari Vilchez-Quero & Laville, 1987
- Eukiefferiella boevrensis Brundin, 1956
- Eukiefferiella brehmi Gouin, 1943
- Eukiefferiella brevicalcar (Kieffer, 1911)
- Eukiefferiella brevinervis (Malloch, 1915)
- Eukiefferiella brundini Boothroyd & Cranston, 1994
- Eukiefferiella busanensis Ree 2012
- Eukiefferiella claripennis (Lundbeck, 1898)
- Eukiefferiella clypeata (Kieffer, 1923)
- Eukiefferiella coerulescens (Kieffer, 1926)
- Eukiefferiella commensalis (Tonnoir, 1923)
- Eukiefferiella cyanea Thienemann, 1936
- Eukiefferiella devonica (Edwards, 1929)
- Eukiefferiella dittmari Lehmann, 1972
- Eukiefferiella endobryonia Imada, 2020
- Eukiefferiella fittkaui Lehmann, 1972
- Eukiefferiella fuldensis Lehmann, 1972
- Eukiefferiella gracei (Edwards, 1929)
- Eukiefferiella heveli Sublette & Wirth, 1980
- Eukiefferiella ilkleyensis (Edwards, 1929)
- Eukiefferiella insolida (Skuse, 1889)
- Eukiefferiella isigaefeus Sasa & Suzuki, 2000
- Eukiefferiella lobifera Goetghebuer, 1934
- Eukiefferiella minor (Edwards, 1929)
- Eukiefferiella mirabilis Serra-Tosio, 1983
- Eukiefferiella pseudomontana Goetghebuer, 1935
- Eukiefferiella quadridentata Chernovskij, 1949
- Eukiefferiella similis Goetghebuer, 1939
- Eukiefferiella tirolensis Goetghebuer, 1938
- Eukiefferiella unicalcar (Saether, 1969)
