= Jean Jacques Kickx =

Belgian botanist (1842-1887)

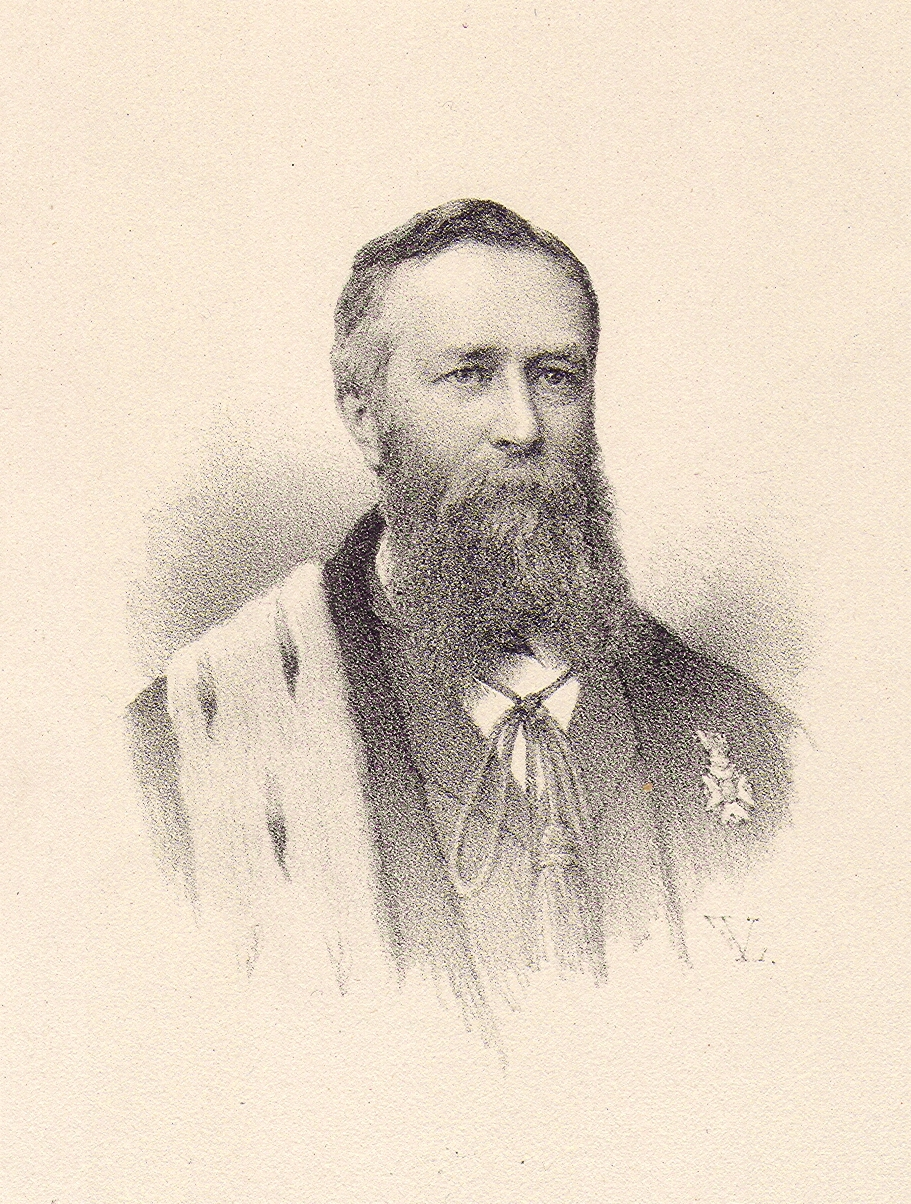
Jean Jacques Kickx

Jean Jacques Kickx (27 January 1842, Ghent – 27 March 1887, Ghent) was a Belgian botanist. His father, Jean Kickx (1803–1864), and grandfather, also named Jean Kickx (1775–1831), were both botanists.

He was educated in Ghent and Bonn, obtaining his doctorate of sciences in 1863. In 1867 he was appointed professor of botany at the University of Ghent as well as director of the botanical garden and school of horticulture. In 1879 he became president of the Société royale de botanique de Belgique, and in 1887 was named rector of the university.

== Published works ==
- Monographie des Spenophyllum d'Europe (with Eugène Coemans), 1864 - Monograph on Sphenophyllum of Europe.
- Flore Cryptogamique des Flandres (posthumous oeuvre of Jean Kickx), 1867 - Cryptogamic flora of Flanders.
- Les Ranonculacées du littoral belge - Ranunculaceae of littoral Belgium.
- Sur la formation et la division des cellules (with Eduard Strasburger), 1876 - On the formation and division of cells.
