= Stephen Powles =

- Born: 1950 (age 75–76); New South Wales, Australia
- Citizenship: Australian
- Education: University of Western Sydney; Michigan State University; Australian National University
- Known for: Research on herbicide resistance in weeds
- Scientific career
- Fields: Plant science; Crop & weed science
- Workplaces: University of Adelaide; University of Western Australia

Stephen B. Powles (born 1950) is an Australian plant scientist known for his research on herbicide resistance in weeds. He is emeritus Professor at the University of Western Australia and has been recognised for contributions to agricultural science through election to the Australian Academy of Science and the Australian Academy of Technological Sciences and Engineering.

Powles has published more than 300 peer-reviewed papers on crop and weed science, herbicides, plant productivity, and photosynthesis. His review papers in the Annual Review of Plant Biology (1984, 1994, 2010) have been widely cited. His Google Scholar h-index is 98.

== Early life and education ==
Powles was born in 1950 in rural New South Wales, Australia, one of five children raised by a single mother. He left school at age 15 and worked in agriculture before enrolling at Tocal Agricultural College, where he completed a Certificate in Agriculture, graduating dux in 1971. He then studied agricultural science at the University of Western Sydney (Hawkesbury), graduating in 1974 with first class Honours.

He completed a master's degree at Michigan State University (1976) supported by a Rotary International fellowship, and a PhD at the Australian National University in 1980. Between 1980 and 1983 he held postdoctoral fellowships at the Carnegie Institution for Science, Stanford University, and at the CNRS in France.

== Academic career ==
In 1983 Powles returned to Australia, joining the University of Adelaide where he created a major research program on herbicide resistance in agriculture. He later became the founding director of the Cooperative Research Centre (CRC) for Australian Weed Management (1995–1998).

From 1998 to 2020 he was Professor at the University of Western Australia and the founding director of the Australian Herbicide Resistance Initiative (AHRI), which he led for two decades. His research addressed the evolution of herbicide resistance in weeds, molecular mechanisms of resistance, and practical strategies for agricultural management.

He supervised 30 PhD students, 17 postdoctoral fellows, and 43 honours students between 1984 and 2018.

== Contributions to agriculture ==
Powles is regarded as a researcher in the evolution and management of herbicide-resistant weeds. His work informed Australian agriculture's approach to herbicide use and sustainability. He contributed to the introduction of mandatory herbicide mode-of-action labelling in Australia and to the development of harvest weed seed control technologies such as the Harrington Seed Destructor, a non-chemical method of weed seed destruction during harvest.

He served as the inaugural chair (2002–2012) of the Australian government's Gene Technology Technical Advisory Committee (GTTAC), which advises the Gene Technology Regulator on genetically modified organisms.

== Later activities ==
Since retiring from full-time academia in 2020, Powles has remained active as emeritus Professor at the University of Western Australia. He serves on the boards of agricultural start-up companies in the United States and France, EnkoChem, Micropep Technologies, and BioHarpe, and is a foreign expert at Nanjing Agricultural University, China. He is also involved in volunteer roles with the Australian Academy of Science and the Grains Industry of Western Australia.

== Awards and honours ==
- CSIRO Overseas Postdoctoral Fellowship (1980)
- Reserve Bank of Australia Fellowship (1982)
- Fellow of the Australian Academy of Technological Sciences and Engineering (1999)
- Centenary Medal, Australian Government (2001)
- Fellow of the Australian Academy of Science (2012)
- GRDC Seed of Light Award (2010)
- American Chemical Society International Award for Research in Agrochemicals (2018)
- BASF Industry Recognition Award (2020)
- GRDC Seed of Gold Award (2021)

== Selected publications ==
- Powles, S.B. (1984). "Photoinhibition of photosynthesis induced by visible light." Annual Review of Plant Biology, 35: 15–44.
- Holt, J.S., Holtum, J.A.M., & Powles, S.B. (1994). "Mechanisms and agronomic aspects of herbicide resistance." Annual Review of Plant Physiology and Plant Molecular Biology, 45: 427–447.
- Powles, S.B., & Yu, Q. (2010). "Evolution in action: Plants resistant to herbicides." Annual Review of Plant Biology, 61: 317–347.
- Walsh, M.J., Harrington, R.B., & Powles, S.B. (2012). "Harrington Seed Destructor: A new nonchemical weed control tool for global grain crops." Crop Science, 52: 1343–1347.
- Walsh, M.J., Newman, P., & Powles, S.B. (2013). "Targeting weed seeds in-crop: A new weed control paradigm for global agriculture." Weed Technology, 27: 431–436.
- Han, H., Yu, Q., Beffa, R., González, S., Maiwald, F., Wang, J., & Powles, S.B. (2020). "Cytochrome P450 CYP81A10v7 in Lolium rigidum confers metabolic resistance to herbicides across at least five modes of action." Plant Journal, 105: 79–92.
