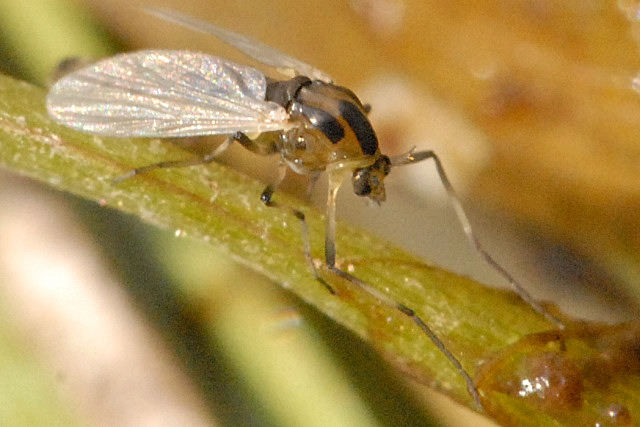

Scientific classification
- Kingdom: Animalia
- Phylum: Arthropoda
- Class: Insecta
- Order: Diptera
- Family: Chironomidae
- Genus: Potthastia
- Species: P. gaedii

Binomial name
- Potthastia gaedii (Meigen, 1838)

= Potthastia gaedii =

Species of fly

Potthastia gaedii is a non-biting midge species in the genus Potthastia.
