= Potthastia montium =

Scientific classification
- Kingdom: Animalia
- Phylum: Arthropoda
- Class: Insecta
- Order: Diptera
- Family: Chironomidae
- Genus: Potthastia
- Species: P. montium

Binomial name
- Potthastia montium (Edwards, 1929)

Synonyms
- Diamesa montium Edwards, 1929

Species of fly

Potthastia montium is a non-biting midge species in the genus Potthastia.
