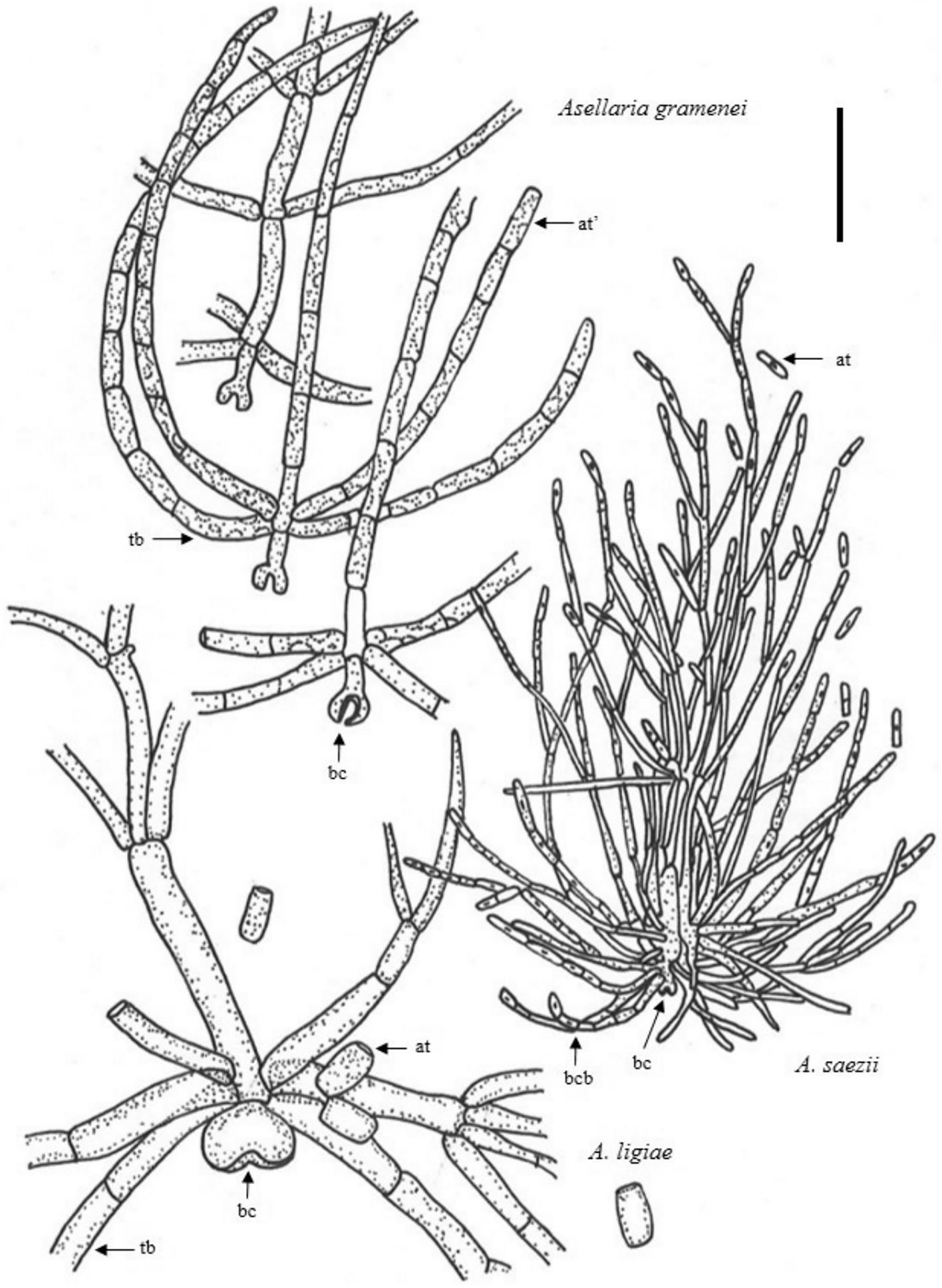
- Drawing of different species of Asellaria

Scientific classification
- Kingdom: Fungi
- Division: Kickxellomycota
- Subdivision: Kickxellomycotina
- Class: Asellariomycetes; Tedersoo, Sanchez-Ramirez, Kõljalg, Bahram, M. Döring, Schigel, T.W. May, M. Ryberg & Abarenkov
- Order: Asellariales; Manier ex Manier & Lichtw.

= Asellariales =

Order of fungi

The Asellariales are an order of fungi classified under Kickxellomycotina.

Species include Asellaria dactylopus and Asellaria jatibonicua.
