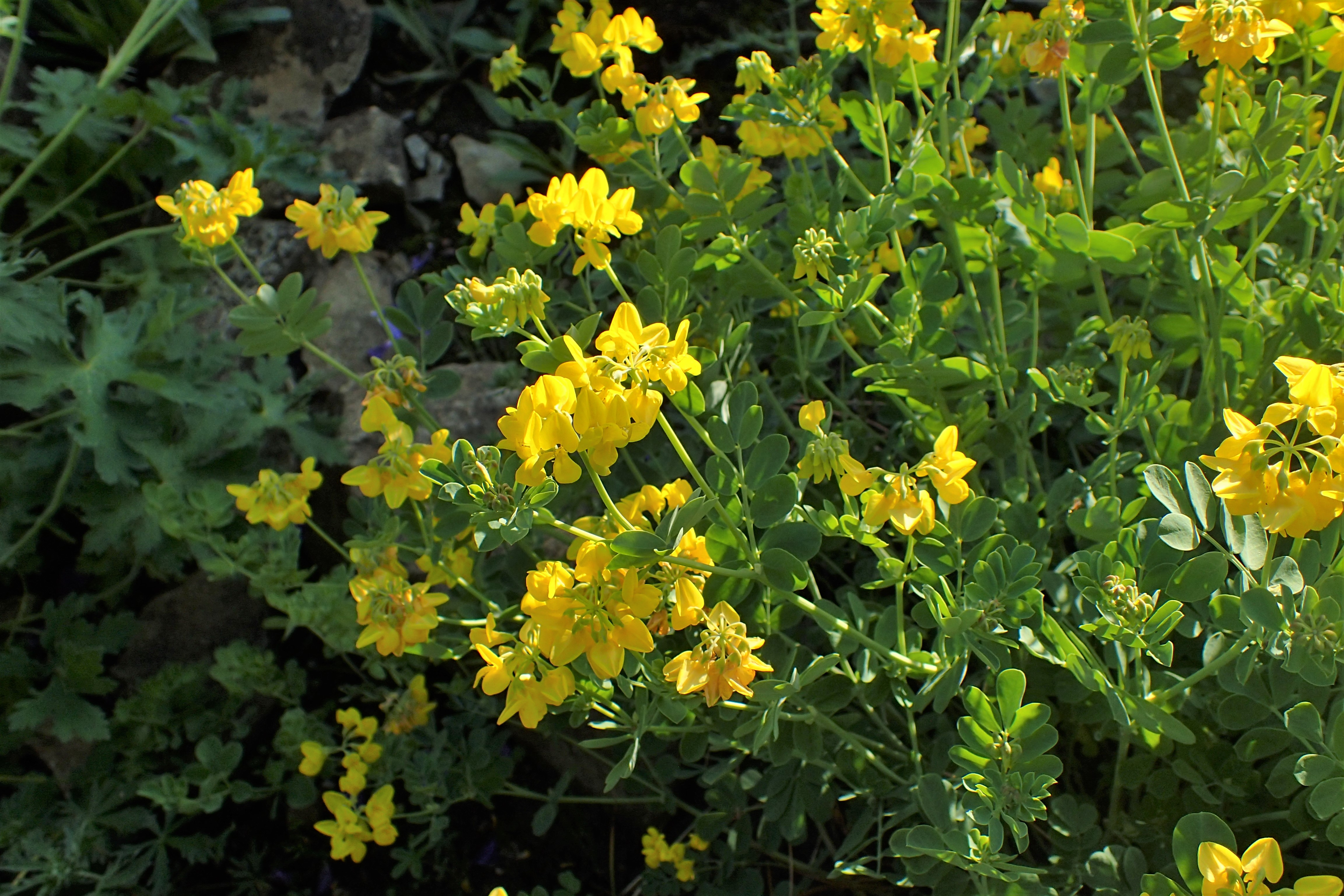

Scientific classification
- Kingdom: Plantae
- Clade: Tracheophytes
- Clade: Angiosperms
- Clade: Eudicots
- Clade: Rosids
- Order: Fabales
- Family: Fabaceae
- Subfamily: Faboideae
- Genus: Securigera
- Species: S. orientalis

Binomial name
- Securigera orientalis (Mill.) Lassen

Synonyms
- Coronilla cappadocica Willd. Coronilla iberica M.Bieb.

= Securigera orientalis =

Species of legume

Securigera orientalis is an ornamental plant native to the Caucasus region of Asia.
