= Harpellaceae =

Scientific classification
- Kingdom: Fungi
- Division: Kickxellomycota
- Class: Harpellomycetes
- Order: Harpellales
- Family: Harpellaceae; L.Léger & Duboscq ex P.M.Kirk & P.F.Cannon (2007)

Type genus
- Harpella L.Léger & Duboscq (1929)

Genera
- Carouxella; Harpella; Harpellomyces; Stachylina; Stachylinoides

Family of fungi

The Harpellaceae are a family of fungi in the Harpellales order. The family contains 5 genera and 40 species.
