= Potthastia pastoris =

Scientific classification
- Kingdom: Animalia
- Phylum: Arthropoda
- Class: Insecta
- Order: Diptera
- Family: Chironomidae
- Genus: Potthastia
- Species: P. pastoris

Binomial name
- Potthastia pastoris (Edwards, 1933)

Species of fly

Potthastia pastoris is a non-biting midge species in the genus Potthastia.
