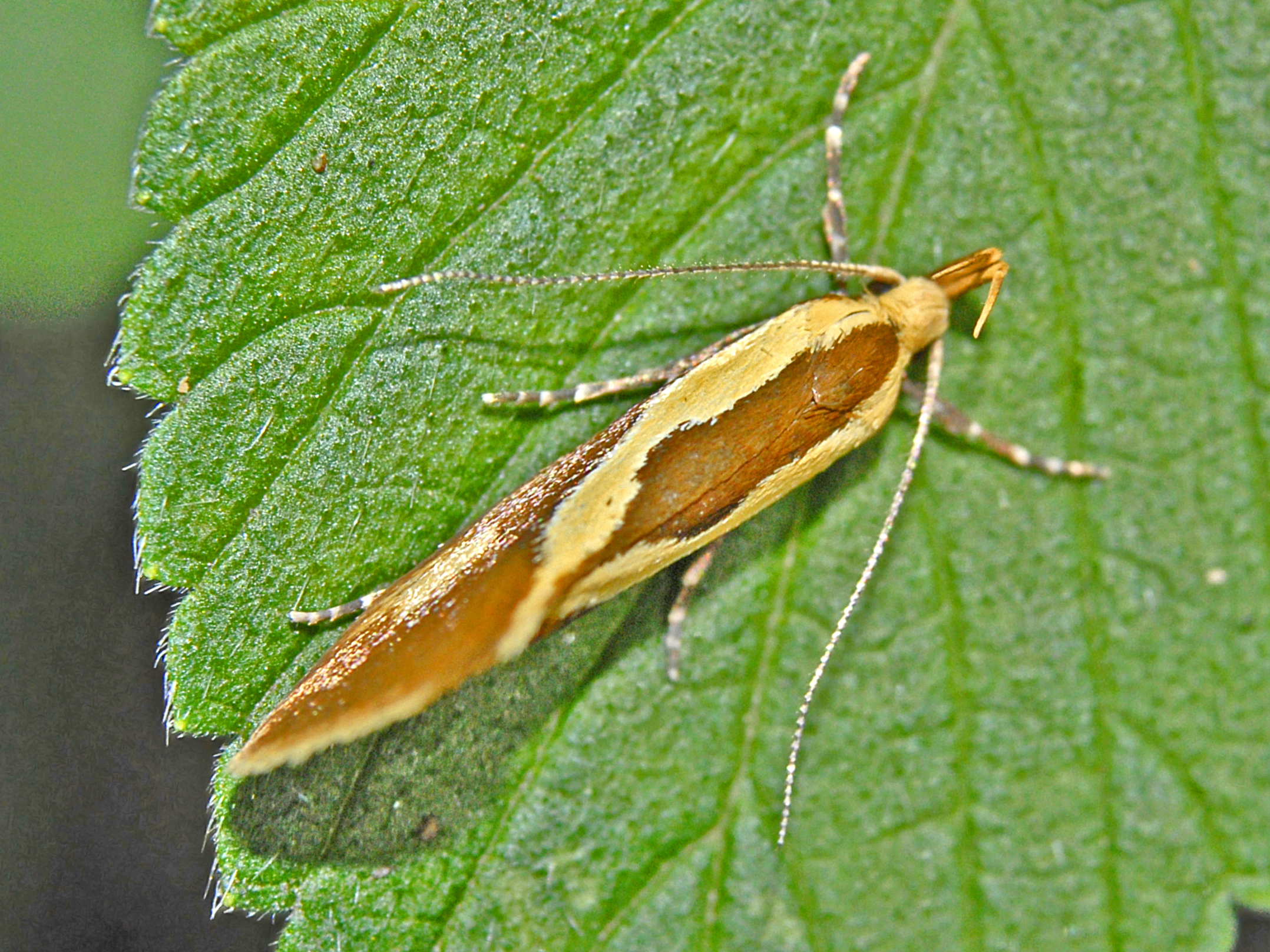
- Harpella forficella

Scientific classification
- Domain: Eukaryota
- Kingdom: Animalia
- Phylum: Arthropoda
- Class: Insecta
- Order: Lepidoptera
- Family: Oecophoridae
- Tribe: Oecophorini
- Genus: Harpella; Schrank, 1802

Species
- See text.

= Harpella (moth) =

Genus of moths

Harpella is a genus of moths of the family Oecophoridae.

== Species ==
The genus consists of the following species:

- Harpella aerisella
- Harpella ambiquellus
- Harpella forficella
- Harpella majorella
- Harpella proboscidella
- Harpella semnodoxa
