= Henri Eugène Lucien Gaëtan Coemans =

Belgian Catholic priest and botanist (1825–1871)

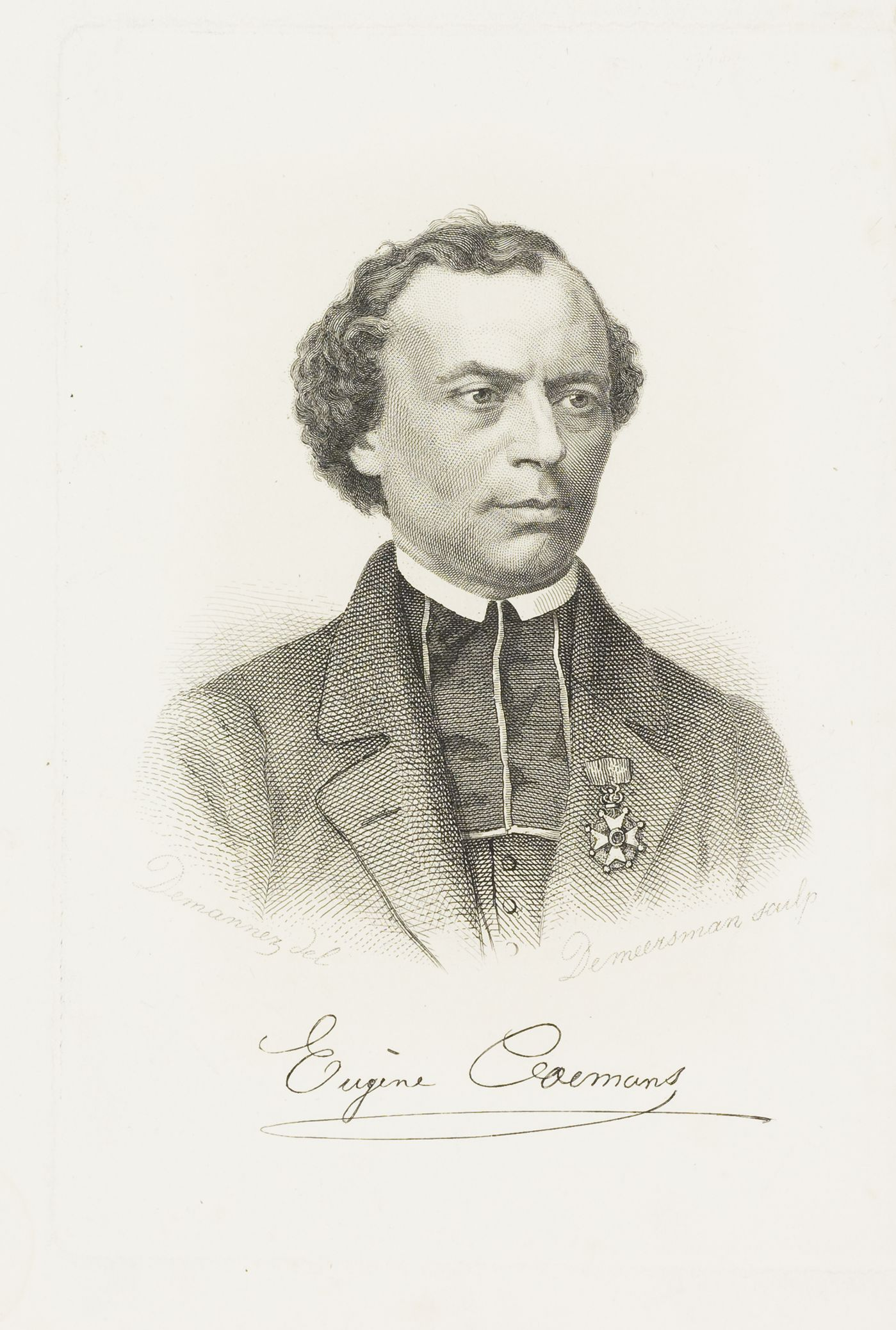
Eugène Coemans

Henri Eugène Lucien Gaëtan Coemans (30 October 1825, Brussels – 8 January 1871, Ghent) was a Belgian Catholic priest and botanist.

In 1848 he obtained his ordination, later serving as a curate in Ghent (from 1853). In 1864 he became a member of the Académie royale des Sciences et Belles-Lettres de Bruxelles, followed by a professorship at the Catholic University of Leuven in 1866. From 1868 to 1871 he was director of a Franciscan convent in Ghent.

As a taxonomist he identified the genus Fittonia (family Acanthaceae). The genus Coemansia is named in his honor.

== Selected works ==
- Monographie du genre Pilobolus, Tode, spècialement ètudiè au point de vue anatomique et physiologique, 1861 - Monograph of the genus Pilobolus.
- Spicilège mycologique, 1862 - Mycological scrapbook.
- Notices biographiques sur quelques lichenographes celebres, 1864 - Biographical notices of some celebrated lichenologists.
- Monographie des Spenophyllum d'Europe (with Jean Jacques Kickx), 1864 - Monograph on Sphenophyllum of Europe.
- Description de la flore fossile du premier ètage du terrain crètacè du Hainaut, 1867 - Description of fossil flora from the first stage of the Cretaceous terrain in Hainaut.

Coemans issued the exsiccata Cladoniae Belgicae exsiccatae, quas collegit et distribuit, schedulis criticis additis, Eugenius Coemans.
