= Corixa iberica =

Scientific classification
- Domain: Eukaryota
- Kingdom: Animalia
- Phylum: Arthropoda
- Class: Insecta
- Order: Hemiptera
- Suborder: Heteroptera
- Family: Corixidae
- Genus: Corixa
- Species: C. iberica

Binomial name
- Corixa iberica Jansson, 1981

Species of true bug

Corixa iberica is a species of water boatman in the family Corixidae in the order Hemiptera.
