= Potthastia iberica =

Scientific classification
- Kingdom: Animalia
- Phylum: Arthropoda
- Class: Insecta
- Order: Diptera
- Family: Chironomidae
- Genus: Potthastia
- Species: P. iberica

Binomial name
- Potthastia iberica Serra-tosio, 1971

Species of fly

Potthastia iberica is a non-biting midge species in the genus Potthastia.
