= Aminocyclopyrachlor =

Names
- IUPAC name 6-amino-5-chloro-2-cyclopropylpyrimidine-4-carboxylic acid
- Other names: KJM44; DPX-KJM44; MAT-28; 6-amino-5-chloro-2-cyclopropyl-4-pyrimidinecarboxylic acid

Identifiers
CAS Number	858956-08-8
3D model (JSmol)	Interactive image
ChEBI	CHEBI:62952
ChemSpider	21442054
ECHA InfoCard	100.121.525
EC Number	617-769-9
PubChem CID	17747875
UNII	O19K7667GO
CompTox Dashboard (EPA)	DTXSID0074683
- InChI: InChI=1S/C8H8ClN3O2/c9-4-5(8(13)14)11-7(3-1-2-3)12-6(4)10/h3H,1-2H2,(H,13,14)(H2,10,11,12) Key: KWAIHLIXESXTJL-UHFFFAOYSA-N
- SMILES: C1CC1C2=NC(=C(C(=N2)N)Cl)C(=O)O

Properties
Chemical formula	C_{8}H_{8}ClN_{3}O_{2}
Molar mass	213.62 g·mol^{−1}
Appearance	white amorphous solid
Density	1.47 kg/L
Melting point	140 °C (284 °F; 413 K)
Solubility in water	2.81 g/L
Solubility in methanol	36.7g/L
Vapor pressure	0.007 mPa
- Except where otherwise noted, data are given for materials in their standard state (at 25 °C [77 °F], 100 kPa). Infobox references

Aminocyclopyrachlor (AMCP) is a selective, low-toxicity, auxin-mimicking herbicide that provides pre- and post-emergent control of broadleaf weeds on several non-food use sites including rights of way, wildlife management areas, recreational areas, turf/lawns, golf courses and sod farms.

It was conditionally registered as Imprelis by DuPont in August 2010, and first used in Fall 2010, though used experimentally since 2008 or before. In 2014, DuPont settled with the United States Environmental Protection Agency (EPA) in response to reports of damage to trees after application of Imprelis.

== Chemical properties ==
It has some solubility in water, 2.81 g/L, more so in methanol, 36.7 g/L, and is practically insoluble in acetone, 0.96 g/L, dichloromethane, 0.2 g/L, acetonitrile, 0.65 g/L and n-octanol, 1.9 g/L. The low vapor pressure and Henry's law constant suggest that it will not disperse through the air. A low octanol/water partition constant of -1.12 (Log Pow) indicates it be not bioaccumulative, and technical grade aminocyclopyrachor should be stable for at least 2 years in normal storage conditions.

Aminocyclopyrachlor is not flammable, explosive or auto-flammable and except for photo-degradation, the pure aminocyclopyrachlor isn't chemically incompatible with oxidising or reducing agents and is essentially non-hazardous.

== Mechanism of action ==
Aminocyclopyrachlor is a systemic herbicide and acts by disrupting gene expression. It belongs to the pyrimidine carboxylic acid chemical family and mimics auxin which is a growth-regulating hormone in dicots including broadleaf terrestrial plants. This causes undifferentiated cell division and elongation, with resulting appearance characteristic of auxin herbicide damage such as leaf twisting and curling.

This makes it a Group 4 herbicide, under the HRAC classification system.

== Use as an herbicide ==
After the first introduction in 2010, aminocyclopyrachlor was registered as an active ingredient in Australia in September 2014, but no product containing it was registered until Bayer's "Method 240 SL" in 2022. Before this, aminocyclopyrachlor was registered in New Zealand. Method is a 240 g/L soluble concentrate (SL), with aminocyclopyrachlor present as its potassium salt.

DuPont registered DuPont DPX-KJM44 0.02G Lawn Herbicide + Fertilizer, a formulation of 0.02% AMCP with fertilizer in 2010, although they voluntarily withdrew the registration in 2014.

It may be applied at 312 g/Ha (active ingredient) in 100-400 L/Ha of water.

=== Imprelis ===
Imprelis was the brand name of a formulation of aminocyclopyrachlor marketed by DuPont for use on lawn and turf applications in the United States. It was conditionally approved by the EPA in August 2010 and was introduced to the market in October 2010.

In August 2011, sales of Imprelis were suspended as reports emerged of trees experiencing damage after application of Imprelis. In the same month, the EPA issued a Stop Sale, Use or Removal Order for Imprelis. In September 2011, its registration was amended restricting its distribution and sale without the permission of the EPA.

The EPA registration for Imprelis expired in September 2014.

== Toxicology ==
The human ADI is 2.8 mg/kg/day, (224 mg/day for an 80 kg adult) based on a NOEL of 297 mg/kg/d in a 2 year long study on rats.

== Non-target plant effects ==
Although auxin-mimicking herbicides are selectively toxic to dicots, some angiosperms are also affected. Due to the emergence of damage to some conifer species, the United States Environmental Protection Agency and DuPont advised professional applicators and residential consumers to not use Imprelis where Norway spruce or white pine trees are present on or near the property being treated.

=== Residue ===
Tomato plants are the preeminent bioassay platform for testing auxin herbicide damage because they are extremely sensitive to it. In a controlled greenhouse test, tomato plants were mulched with the remains of Norway spruce and honey locust trees that were damaged from exposure to AMCP that had been applied to adjacent turf grass more than a year prior to the tomato tests. The mulch (i.e. shredded foliage and stems) contained 4.7 to 276 ppb of AMCP. All of the AMCP-exposed tomato plants sustained visible damage while the unexposed controls showed no damage. Residual AMCP in the exposed tomato plants ranged from 0.5 to 8.0 ppb.

=== Environmental fate ===
As with aminopyralid, AMCP-contaminated soil, mulch, or compost should be excluded from sensitive crops or gardens. Plant material that has been treated with AMCP may not be used for mulch or compost. The dissipation half-life (DT_{50}) time of AMCP has been measured at between 3 and >112 days in four soils from the Northern Great Plains. More recently, the time required for 90% degradation (DT_{90}) was found to be 622 to 921 days, although an APVMA report cites a half-life in normal air of 42 hours, implying a wildly shorter DT_{90}.

== Litigation ==
In July 2011, a class action lawsuit was filed alleging that DuPont failed to provide adequate warnings about the effects of Imprelis on non-target plants. A settlement in the class action suit was preliminarily approved in February 2013 and was approved in October 2013.

In September 2014, the EPA filed a Consent Agreement and Final Order (CAFO) against DuPont alleging violations of the Federal Insecticide, Fungicide, and Rodenticide Act relating to Imprelis. The order alleges that the Imprelis label "...did not contain directions for use and/or warning or caution statements which were adequate to protect non-target terrestrial plants when used in accordance with the approved label." It also alleges that DuPont failed to report the results of 18 field studies that demonstrated adverse effects on non-target plants. DuPont paid $1.85 million dollars to settle the order.

== Tradenames ==
Aminocyclopyrachlor has been sold as "DPX-KJM44", "Aptexor", "Imprelis", "Method", "Perspective", "Streamline", "Invora", "Viewpoint", "Plainview", "Navius", "TruVist" and "TruRange". This list may be incomplete.
