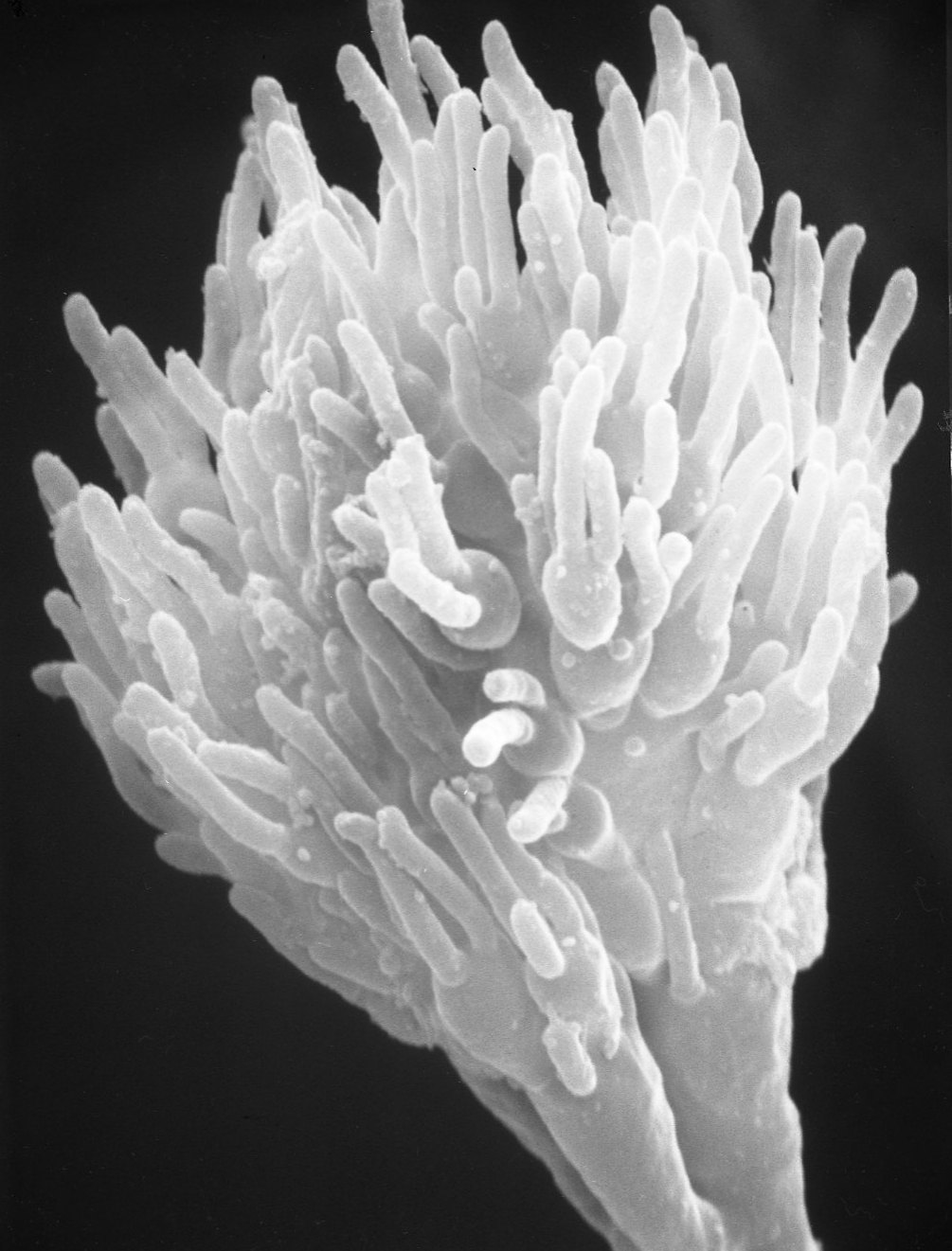
- Dimargaris bacillispora

Scientific classification
- Kingdom: Fungi
- Division: Kickxellomycota
- Class: Dimargaritomycetes
- Order: Dimargaritales; R.K. Benj. 1979

Families
- Dimargaritaceae

= Dimargaritales =

Order of fungi

Dimargaritales is a monotypic order of fungi in the monotypic Dimargaritomycetes class within the subdivision of Kickxellomycotina.

Dimargaritales was published in 1979, while Dimargaritomycetes was published by Tedersoo et al. in Fungal Diversity vol.90, Issue 1 on page 151 in 2018.

It is parasitic. But can grow solitary on agar media, thus cold facultative parasite.

Only one family, Dimargaritaceae, exists, containing three genera:

- Dimargaritaceae
  - Dimargaris - 7 spp.
  - Dispira - 4 spp.
  - Tieghemiomyces - 2 spp.
- Dimargaritales incertae sedis
  - Spinalia
