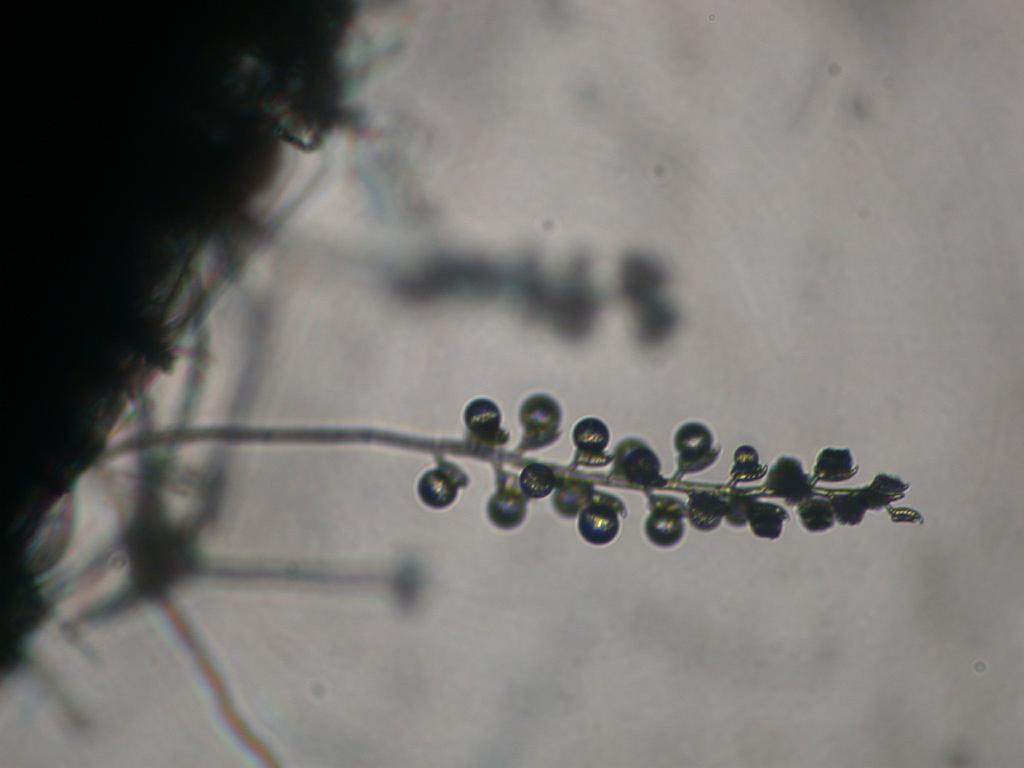
- Coemansia sp.

Scientific classification
- Kingdom: Fungi
- Division: Kickxellomycota
- Subdivision: Kickxellomycotina; Benny 2007

Orders
- Ramicandelaberales; Dimargaritales; Barbatosporales; Spiromycetales; Orphellales; Asellariales; Kickxellales; Harpellales

Synonyms
- Harpellomycotina Doweld 2014

= Kickxellomycotina =

Subdivision of fungi

Kickxellomycotina are a fungus grouping in the subkingdom of Zoopagomyceta Benny, 2007.

The name was changed from "Harpellomycotina", because "Kickxellomycotina" had an older stem. It came from the genus Kickxella, named after Jean Kickx.

Orders include Asellariales, Kickxellales, Dimargaritales, and Harpellales.

== Taxonomy ==
Taxonomy based on the work of Wijayawardene et al. 2019.

Subphylum Kickxellomycotina Benny 2007 [Harpellomycotina Doweld 2014]

- Class Dimargaritomycetes Tedersoo et al. 2018
  - Order Ramicandelaberales Doweld 2014
    - Family Ramicandelaberaceae Doweld 2014
  - Order Dimargaritales Benjamin 1979
    - Family Spinaliaceae Doweld 2014
    - Family Dimargaritaceae Benjamin 1959
- Class Kickxellomycetes Tedersoo et al. 2018
  - Order Barbatosporales Doweld 2014
    - Family Barbatosporaceae Doweld 2014
  - Order Spiromycetales Doweld 2014
    - Family Spiromycetaceae Doweld 2014
  - Order Orphellales Valle et al. 2018
    - Family Orphellaceae Doweld 2014
  - Order Kickxellales Kreisel 1969 ex. Benjamin 1979
    - Family Kickxellaceae Linder 1943
  - Clade Trichomycetalia Cavalier-Smith 1998
    - Order Asellariales Manier 1950 ex. Manier & Lichtwardt 1978 emend. Valle & Cafaro 2008
      - Family Baltomycetaceae Doweld 2013
      - Family Asellariaceae Manier 1950 ex. Manier & Lichtward 1968 [Orchesellariaceae Doweld 2014]
    - Order Harpellales Lichtwardt & Manier 1978 [Smittiales]
      - Family Harpellaceae Léger & Duboscq 1929 ex Kirk & Cannon 2007
      - Family Legeriomycetaceae Pouzar 1972 [Genestellaceae Léger & Gauthier 1932]
