= Harpellales =

Scientific classification
- Kingdom: Fungi
- Division: Kickxellomycota
- Subdivision: Kickxellomycotina
- Class: Harpellomycetes; Tedersoo, Sanchez-Ramirez, Kõljalg, Bahram, M. Döring, Schigel, T.W. May, M. Ryberg & Abarenkov
- Order: Harpellales; Lichtw. & Manier (1978)

Families
- Harpellaceae; Legeriomycetaceae

Order of fungi

The Harpellales are an order of fungi classified in the subdivision Kickxellomycotina. Thalli are either unbranched or branched, producing basipetal series of trichospores. Zygospores are biconical. Species in the order are found attached to the gut lining of aquatic larvae of Insecta or (rarely) Isopoda. Harpellales are divided into two families, the Harpellaceae and the Legeriomycetaceae. According to the Dictionary of the Fungi (10th edition, 2008), the order contains 38 genera and 200 species. The order was formally described in 1978 Mycotaxon publication. Harpellales has served as a model to study and understand the evolution, growth, and biodiversity of other such fungi found in the gut as species are plentiful around the world.

Species include Allantomyces zopilotei, Bojamyces olmecensis, Gauthieromyces viviparus and Graminella ophiuroidea.
