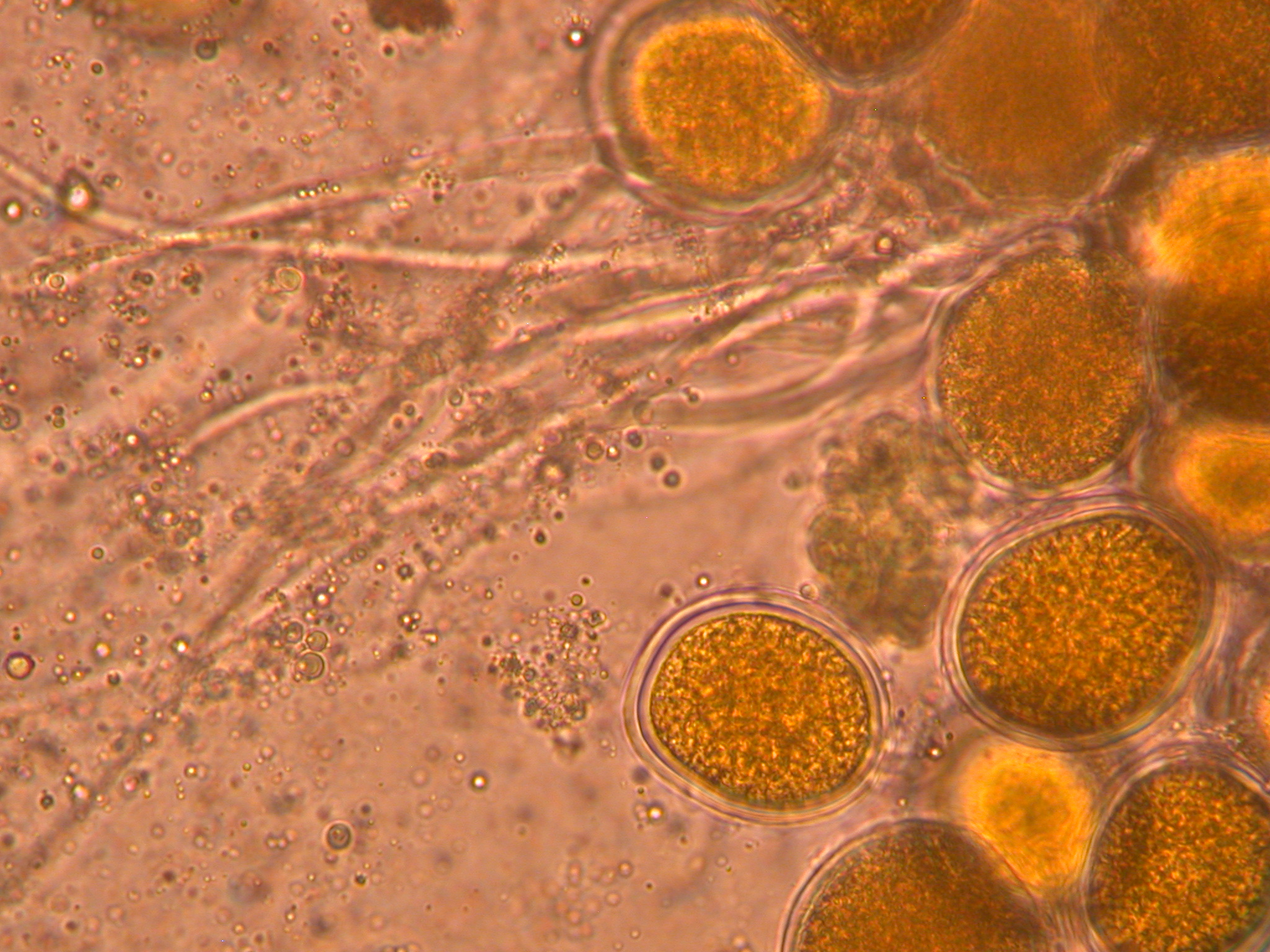
- Endogone, a mucoromycote

Scientific classification
- Kingdom: Fungi
- Clade: Amastigomycota

Subkingdoms and phyla
- Subkingdom Zoopagomyceta; Phylum Basidiobolomycota; Phylum Entomophthoromycota; Phylum Kickxellomycota; Subphylum Zoopagomycotina; Subphylum Kickxellomycotina; Phylum Mortierellomycota; Subkingdom Mucoromyceta; Phylum Mucoromycota; Phylum Calcarisporiellomycota; Phylum Glomeromycota; Subkingdom Dikarya; Phylum Basidiomycota; Phylum Entorrhizomycota; Phylum Ascomycota

Synonyms
- Eufungi Cavalier-Smith, 1981

= Amastigomycota =

Clade of fungi

Amastigomycota or Eufungi is a clade of fungi. It includes all fungi without flagella or centrioles, and with unstacked Golgi apparatus cisternae. Members of this clade are Dikarya and the traditional paraphyletic assemblage "Zygomycota", now divided into several monophyletic phyla.

== Classifications ==
=== Cavalier-Smith (1981) ===
- Kingdom (or Subkingdom) Eufungi
  - Phylum Hemiascomycota
  - Phylum Ustomycota
  - Phylum Zygomycota
  - Phylum Ascomycota
  - Phylum Uredomycota
  - Phylum Basidiomycota

At the time, the monophyly of Fungi (Eumycota) was not fully certain. Cavalier-Smith considered one scenario where Eufungi could be ancestral or basal to other eukaryotes due to their relatively simple cytology and small genome, though he favoured the hypothesis of fungal monophyly, which is now the consensus.

== Phylogenetic tree ==
rRNA:

- Zoosporia
  - - Rozellomyceta
      - Rozella
      - Microsporidia "Microsporidiomycota"
        - Mitosporidium
        - - Paramicrosporidium
          - - Nucleophaga
            - - Metchnikovellea
              - Microsporea
  - - Aphelidiomyceta
      - Aphelidiomycota
        Aphelidiomycetes
    - Eumycota
      - - Chytridiomyceta
          - Neocallimastigomycota
            Neocallimastigomycetes
          - Chytridiomycota
            - Monoblepharomycotina
              - Hyaloraphidiomycetes
              - Monoblepharidomycetes
              - Sanchytriomycetes
            - Chytridiomycotina
              - Mesochytriomycetes
              - Chytridiomycetes
      - - Blastocladiomyceta
          - Blastocladiomycota
            - Blastocladiomycetes
            - Physodermatomycetes
        - Amastigomycota
          - - Zoopagomyceta
              - Basidiobolomycota
                - Basidiobolomycetes
                - Olpidiomycetes
              - - Entomophthoromycota
                  - Neozygitomycetes
                  - Entomophthoromycetes
                - Kickxellomycota
                  - Zoopagomycotina
                    Zoopagomycetes
                  - Kickxellomycotina
                    - Dimargaritomycetes
                    - Kickxellomycetes
          - - - Mortierellomycota
                Mortierellomycetes
            - - Mucoromyceta
                - Calcarisporiellomycota
                  Calcarisporiellomycetes
                - Mucoromycota
                  - Umbelopsidomycetes
                  - Mucoromycetes
              - Symbiomycota
                - Glomeromycota
                  - Paraglomeromycetes
                  - - Archaeosporomycetes
                    - Glomeromycetes
                - Dikarya
                  - - Entorrhizomycota
                      Entorrhizomycetes
                    - Basidiomycota
                  - Ascomycota
