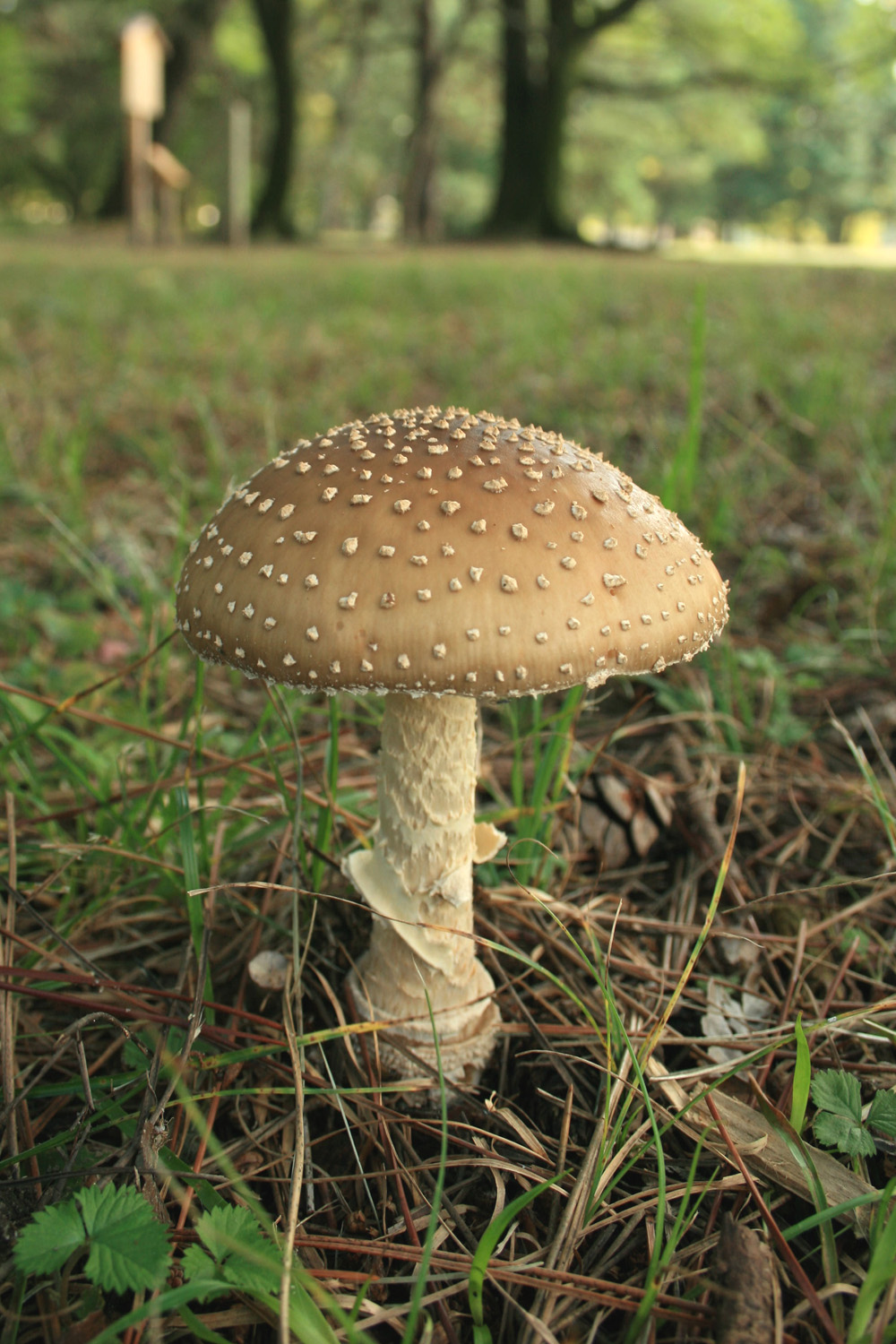
- Amanita pantherina, from the Basidiomycota

Scientific classification
- Kingdom: Fungi
- Clade: Amastigomycota
- Clade: Symbiomycota

Divisions
- Glomeromycota; Dikarya

= Symbiomycota =

Clade of fungi

Symbiomycota is a clade of fungi containing both Glomeromycota and Dikarya. It includes all mycorrhizal fungi except Endogone and the Mucoromycotina fine root endophytes, which both belong in Mucoromycota.

Symbiomycota is supported by phylogenetic analyses based on ribosomal DNA and rpb2 data but not from rpb1 data. More recent analyses using genome-scale, multilocus protein sequence data have either recovered this clade or have failed to recover it, with Glomeromycota falling within Mucoromycota instead (forming Mucoromyceta).

== Etymology ==
The name references symbiosis due to the inclusion of most mycorrhizal fungi within this clade.

== Taxonomy ==
The following dendrogram shows the placement of Symbiomycota within the kingdom Fungi summarized from rDNA phylogenies.

- Fungi
  - - Rozellomycota
    - - Aphelidiomycota
      - Eumycota
        - - Chytridiomycota
          - Neocallimastigomycota
        - - Blastocladiomycota
          - Amastigomycota
            - Zoopagomycota
            - - Mucoromycota
              - Symbiomycota
                - Glomeromycota
                - Dikarya
                  - Entorrhizomycota
                  - - Ascomycota
                    - Basidiomycota
