= Barthélemy Charles Joseph Dumortier =

Belgian politician and botanist (1797–1878)

Barthélémy du Mortier
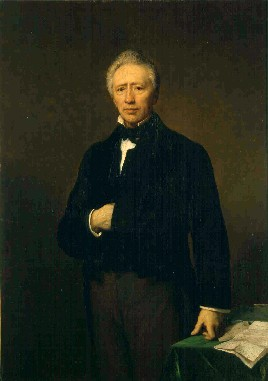
- Born: 3 April 1797; Tournai, Batavian Republic (now Belgium)
- Died: 9 July 1878 (aged 81)
- Spouse: Philippine Louise Rutteau
- Children: Eight
- Scientific career
- Fields: Botany
- Author abbrev. (botany): Dumort.

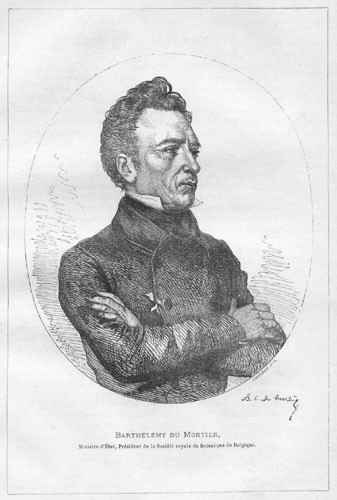

Barthélemy Charles Joseph Dumortier (French: [baʁtelemi ʃaʁl ʒozɛf dymɔʁtje]; 3 April 1797 – 9 July 1878) was a Belgian who conducted a parallel career of botanist and Member of Parliament and is the first discoverer of biological cell division.

Over the course of his life, Dumortier named over 688 different taxa, many of which are still in use today.

A statue depicting him can be found in Tournai, Belgium, the city where he spent much of his life. The statue was constructed in 1883, by sculptor Charles Fraikin. The statue was damaged by the Germans during World War I, but was repaired. Dumortier is depicted in bourgeois clothes, with his right arm folded over his chest and his left arm leaning on political documents supported by a lion.

== Biography ==
Barthélemy Dumortier was a son of the merchant and city councillor Barthélemy-François Dumortier and of Mariue-Jeanne Willaumez. He married Philippine Ruteau and they had a son, Barthélemy-Noël Dumortier (1830-1915) and seven other children.

Barthélemy-Charles became politically active in the early eighteen twenties. In 1824 he founded the Courrier de l'Escaut, a paper critical of the government. He adhered in 1830 to the Belgian revolution.

In 1831 he became a member of the first elected parliament of the new kingdom, as the member for Tournai. He remained elected until 1847. He then switched seats and was now elected for the city of Roulers and held this seat until his death.

Dumortier must be regarded as the first discoverer of cell division. In 1832, he described cell division in simple aquatic plants (French 'conferve'):

“Le développement des conferves est aussi simple que leur structure; il s’opère par l’addition de nouvelles cellules aux anciennes, et cette addition se fait toujours par l’extrémité. La cellule terminale s’allonge plus que celles inférieures; alors il s’opère dans le fluide intérieur une production médiane, qui tend à diviser la cellule en deux parties dont l’inférieure reste stationnaire, tandis que la terminale s’allonge de nouveau, produit encore une nouvelle cloison intérieure, et ainsi de même. La production de la cloison médiane est - elle originairement double ou simple? Voilà ce qu’il est impossible de déterminer; mais toujours est-il vrai de dire que plus tard elle paraît double dans les conjuguées, et que quand deux cellules se séparent naturellement, chacune d'elles est close aux deux extrémités.”

In the analogous English translation:

“The development of the conferve is as simple as its structure; it takes place by the attachment of new cells to the old, and this attachment always takes place from the end. The terminal cell elongates more than the deeper cells; then the production of a lateral bisector takes place in the inner fluid, which tends to divide the cell into two parts, of which the deeper one remains stationary, while the terminal part elongates again, forms a new inner partition, and so on. Is the production of the middle partition originally double or single? It is impossible to determine this, but it is always true that it later appears double when united, and that when two cells naturally separate, each of them is closed at both ends.”

In 1872 he was awarded the honorary title of Minister of State. He also was awarded nobility with the title of earl. However, for unknown reasons, he did not raise the necessary patent letters and was therefore not ennobled.

== Botanist ==
In the early 1820s, Dumortier published in Latin his first contribution to botany. In 1827 he published a complete national flora, the Florula Belgica.

In 1829 Dumortier was already regarded as one of the greatest naturalists of the Low-Countries and became a member of the Académie de Bruxelles. He not only studied botany but also zoology.

In 1835 Dumortier first proposed the genus Lepidozia. His reputation as a botanist was so brilliant that the Home Office asked him to be its representative in the Brussels’ Botanic Garden, then a joint stock company, supported by the State. In 1862, the Société Royale de Botanique de Belgique was created and Dumortier became its president.

When the company that ran the Brussels’ botanic garden collapsed, Dumortier developed the idea of a state-owned botanic garden in the capital. He succeeded in convincing the Parliament in 1869 of buying the impressive herbarium and dried collections of the late Carl Friedrich Philipp von Martius. A few months later the state bought the garden of the 'Société Royale d’Horticulture de Belgique'. Dumortier hoped to create a botanic garden whose role model was the Royal Kew Gardens.

His name was given to two plant species: to the Hemerocallis dumortieri (Hemerocallidoideae) and to the Stenocereus dumortieri (Cactaceae).

He was honoured in 1863, in the naming of Mortierella, which is a genus of soil fungi belonging to the order Mortierellales. He was again honored in 1967, in the naming of Aquamortierella, a genus of fungi in the Mortierellaceae family of the Zygomycota.

Some consider him to be the true discoverer of cell division, although he is rarely credited as such.

== Honours ==
- 1870 : Grand Cordon in Order of Leopold.

== List of selected publications ==
- Dumortier, Barthélemy-Charles (1873). Opuscules de botanique 1862-1873. Brussels: G. Mayolez.
- Dumortier, Barthélemy-Charles (1829). Analyse des familles des plantes: avec l'indication des principaux genres qui s'y rattachent (in French). Tournay: Casterman.
- Commentationes botanicae. Observations botaniques (imprimerie de C. Casterman-Dieu, Tournay, 1823).
- Observations sur les graminées de la flore de Belgique (J. Casterman aîné, Tournay, 1823).
- Lettres sur le manifeste du Roi et les griefs de la nation, par Belgicus (J. Casterman aîné, Tournay, 1830).
- Sylloge Jungermannidearum Europae indigenarum, earum genera et species systematice complectens (J. Casterman aîné, Tournay, 1830).
- Recherches sur la structure comparée et le développement des animaux et des végétaux (M. Hayez, Bruxelles, 1832).
- Essai carpographique présentant une nouvelle classification des fruits (M. Hayez, Bruxelles, 1835).
- La Belgique et les vingt-quatre articles (Société nationale, Bruxelles, 1838).
- Observations complémentaires sur le partage des dettes des Pays-Bas (Société nationale, Bruxelles, 1838).
- Dumortier, Barthélemy Charles Joseph (1827). Florula Belgica, operis majoris prodromus (in Latin). Tornaci nerviorum: J. Casterman.

== Literature ==
- Oscar COOMANS DE BRACHENE, Etat présent de la noblesse belge, Annuaire 1988, Brussels, 1988.
- Jean-Luc DE PAEPE & Christiane RAINDORF-GERARD, Le Parlement belge, 1831-1894, Brussels, 1996.

== See also ==
- Category:Taxa named by Barthélemy Charles Joseph Dumortier
