= List of Mortierella species =

Mortierella is a large genus of fungi in the order Mortierellales. As of October 2022, GBIF lists 121 species in the genus, many of which have not been fully described as species. This list ignores species which do not have a valid binomial name.

== A ==
- Mortierella acrotona W.Gams
- Mortierella alliacea Linnem.
- Mortierella alpina Peyronel
- Mortierella ambigua B.S.Mehrotra
- Mortierella amoeboidea W.Gams
- Mortierella angusta (Linnem.) Linnem.
- Mortierella antarctica Linnem.
- Mortierella apiculata Marchal
- Mortierella arcuata E.Wolf
- Mortierella armillariicola W.Gams

== B ==
- Mortierella baccata E.Wolf
- Mortierella bainier Costantin
- Mortierella bainieri Costantin
- Mortierella basiparvispora W.Gams & Grinb.
- Mortierella beljakovae Milko
- Mortierella biramosa Tiegh.
- Mortierella bisporalis (Thaxt.) Björl.

== C ==
- Mortierella calciphila Wrzosek
- Mortierella camargensis W.Gams & R.Moreau
- Mortierella candelabrum Tiegh. & G.Le Monn.
- Mortierella capitata Marchal
- Mortierella cephalosporina Chalab.
- Mortierella chienii P.M.Kirk
- Mortierella chlamydospora (Chesters) Plaäts-Nit.
- Mortierella claussenii Linnem.
- Mortierella clonocystis W.Gams
- Mortierella cogitans Degawa
- Mortierella cystojenkinii W.Gams & Veenb.-Rijks

== D ==
- Mortierella dichotoma Linnem. ex W.Gams

== E ==
- Mortierella echinosphaera Plaäts-Nit.
- Mortierella echinula Linnem.
- Mortierella echinulata Harz
- Mortierella elasson Sideris & G.E.Paxton
- Mortierella elongata Linnem.
- Mortierella elongatula W.Gams & Domsch
- Mortierella epicladia W.Gams & Emden
- Mortierella epigama W.Gams & Domsch
- Mortierella exigua Linnem.

== F ==
- Mortierella fatshederae Linnem., 1969
- Mortierella fimbriata S.H.Ou
- Mortierella fimbricystis W.Gams
- Mortierella fluviae Hyang B.Lee, K.Voigt & T.T.T.Nguyen
- Mortierella formicae Siedlecki
- Mortierella formosana S.F.Wei, H.M.Ho & K.Voigt

== G ==
- Mortierella gamsii Milko
- Mortierella gemmifera M.Ellis
- Mortierella globalpina W.Gams & Veenb.-Rijks
- Mortierella globulifera O.Rostr.

== H ==
- Mortierella hepiali Q.T.Chen & B.Liu
- Mortierella histoplasmatoides W.Gams
- Mortierella horticola Linnem.
- Mortierella humicola Oudem.
- Mortierella humilis Linnem. ex W.Gams
- Mortierella humilis Linnemann
- Mortierella humilissima Pišpek
- Mortierella hyalina (Harz) W.Gams
- Mortierella hypsicladia Degawa & W.Gams

== I ==
- Mortierella indohii C.Y.Chien
- Mortierella insignis Linnem.

== J ==
- Mortierella jenkinii (A.L.Sm.) Naumov

== K ==
- Mortierella kuhlmanii W.Gams

== L ==
- Mortierella lapis Telagathoti, M. Probst & Peintner
- Mortierella lignicola (G.W.Martin) W.Gams & R.Moreau
- Mortierella longigemmata Linnem.

== M ==
- Mortierella macrocystis W.Gams
- Mortierella macrocystopsis W.Gams & Carreiro
- Mortierella mairei Vuill.
- Mortierella malleola (Karkn) Gerd. & Trapp
- Mortierella mehrotraensis Baijal
- Mortierella microspora E.Wolf
- Mortierella microzygospora Degawa
- Mortierella minutissima Tiegh.
- Mortierella mundensis Linnem.
- Mortierella mutabilis Linnem.

== N ==
- Mortierella nantahalensis C.Y.Chien
- Mortierella niveovelutina Cif. & Ashford

== O ==
- Mortierella oligospora Biorling
- Mortierella oligospora Björl.
- Mortierella ovalispora Chalab.

== P ==
- Mortierella paraensis Pfenning & W.Gams
- Mortierella parazychae W.Gams
- Mortierella parvispora Linnem.
- Mortierella pilulifera Tiegh.
- Mortierella pisiformis H.M.Ho, S.F.Wei & K.Voigt
- Mortierella plectoconfusa E.Wolf
- Mortierella polycephala Coem.
- Mortierella polygonia W.Gams & Veenb.-Rijks
- Mortierella porcellionum W.Gams & D.S.Clark
- Mortierella pseudozygospora W.Gams & Carreiro
- Mortierella pulchella Linnem.
- Mortierella pusilla Oudem.
- Mortierella pygmaea Chalab.

== R ==
- Mortierella repens A.L.Sm.
- Mortierella reticulata Tiegh. & G.Le Monn.
- Mortierella rhizogena Dasz.
- Mortierella rishikesha B.S.Mehrotra & B.R.Mehrotra
- Mortierella rostafinskii Bref.

== S ==
- Mortierella sarnyensis Milko
- Mortierella schmuckeri Linnem.
- Mortierella sclerotiella Milko
- Mortierella selenospora W.Gams
- Mortierella signyensis K.Voigt, P.M.Kirk & Bridge
- Mortierella simplex Tiegh. & G.Le Monn.
- Mortierella strangulata Tiegh.
- Mortierella striospora K.B.Deshp. & Mantri
- Mortierella stylospora Dixon-Stew.
- Mortierella subtilissima Oudem.
- Mortierella sugadairana Y.Takash., Degawa & K.Narisawa

== T ==
- Mortierella thereuopodae Degawa
- Mortierella tirolensis Linnem.
- Mortierella traversoana Peyronel
- Mortierella triangularis Telagathoti, M. Probst & Peintner
- Mortierella tsukubaensis Ts.Watan.
- Mortierella tuberosa Tiegh.
- Mortierella turficola Y.Ling

== U ==
- Mortierella umbellata (Bonord.) Sacc., 1895

== V ==
- Mortierella verrucosa Linnem.
- Mortierella verticillata Linnem.

== W ==
- Mortierella wolfii B.S.Mehrotra & Baijal
- Mortierella wuyishanensis F.J.Chen

== Z ==
- Mortierella zonata Linnem. ex W.Gams
- Mortierella zychae Linnem.
