= Calcarisporiellaceae =

Scientific classification
- Kingdom: Fungi
- Subkingdom: Mucoromyceta
- Division: Calcarisporiellomycota; Tedersoo et al., 2018
- Subphylum: Calcarisporiellomycotina; Tedersoo et al., 2018
- Class: Calcarisporiellomycetes; Tedersoo et al., 2018
- Order: Calcarisporiellales; Tedersoo et al., 2018
- Family: Calcarisporiellaceae; Tedersoo et al., 2018

Genera
- Calcarisporiella; Echinochlamydosporium

Diversity
- 2 species

Order of fungi

Calcarisporiellaceae is a family of fungi within the subkingdom Mucoromyceta. It is the only family in the order Calcarisporiellales, class Calcarisporiellomycetes, subphylum Calcarisporiellomycotina and phylum Calcarisporiellomycota. It contains two known genera, Calcarisporiella and Echinochlamydosporium. The two genera each have one species.

== General description ==
They have a thallus that is branched, with septate (has a singular septum) hyphae. The vegetative hyphae is hyaline (has a glassy appearance), smooth and thin-walled. It has cultures with no distinctive smell. The sporangiophores (a receptacle in ferns which bears the sporangia, if present) simple, hyaline, smooth, arising from undifferentiated hyphae. The sporangia is unispored, ellipsoid (in shape), with or without a small columella. Spores are uninucleate (having a single nucleus), hyaline, smooth, thin-walled, ovoid to ellipsoid, with a rounded base. Chlamydospores (if present) are 1-celled, elongate to globose, thick-walled and spiny, and are born laterally on short hyphae. The sexual cycle not known, but they are saprotrophic in soil and non-nematophagous (not carnivorous).

It can be found in soils.

== History ==
Calcarisporiella was originally published in 1974 and originally thought to be an anamorphic member of the Pezizomycotina division, but later phylogenetic analysis of rDNA found that it was separate from the Endogonales and Mucorales clades.

A new genus, Echinochlamydosporium, was described in 2011 and placed in Mortierellaceae family. Then in 2018, after molecular analyses, Echinochlamydosporium was transferred to a new family Calcarisporiellaceae with Calcarisporiella.

The newly described Calcarisporiellomycota (comprising Calcarisporiella thermophila and Echinochlamydosporium variabile) represented a deep lineage with strongest affinities to Mucoromycota or Mortierellomycota.

== Evolution and systematics ==
The Calcarisporiellaceae are a monophyletic group containing two species. According to a 2018 phylogenetic analysis, they are the sister taxon of the phylum Mucoromycota. Along with Mortierellomycota and Glomeromycota, they compose the fungal subkingdom Mucoromyceta.

- Phylum Calcarisporiellomycota Tedersoo et al., 2018
  - Subphylum Calcarisporiellomycotina Tedersoo et al., 2018
    - Class Calcarisporiellomycetes Tedersoo et al., 2018
      - Order Calcarisporiellales Tedersoo et al., 2018
        - Family Calcarisporiellaceae Tedersoo et al., 2018
          - Calcarisporiella de Hoog, 1974
            - Calcarisporiella thermophila (H.C. Evans) de Hoog, 1974
          - Echinochlamydosporium X.Z. Jiang, H.Y. Yu, M.C. Xiang, X.Y. Liu & Xing Z. Liu, 2011
            - Echinochlamydosporium variabile X.Z. Jiang, H.Y. Yu, M.C. Xiang, X.Y. Liu & Xing Z. Liu, 2011
