= Aquamortierella =

Scientific classification
- Domain: Eukaryota
- Kingdom: Fungi
- Division: Mucoromycota
- Class: Mortierellomycetes
- Order: Mortierellales
- Family: Mortierellaceae
- Genus: Aquamortierella; Embree & Indoh (1967)
- Species: A. elegans

Binomial name
- Aquamortierella elegans Embree & Indoh (1967)

Single-species genus of fungi

Aquamortierella is a fungal genus in the family Mortierellaceae. The genus is monotypic, containing the single species Aquamortierella elegans, found in New Zealand and Japan.

The genus name of Aquamortierella is in honour of Barthélemy Dumortier (1797–1878), who was a Belgian who conducted a parallel career of botanist and Member of Parliament.

The genus was circumscribed by Robert W. Embree and Hiroharu Indoh in Bull. Torrey Bot. Club Vol.94 (Issue 6) on pages 464–467 in 1967.
