= Echinochlamydosporium =

Scientific classification
- Kingdom: Fungi
- Division: Mortierellomycota
- Order: Mortierellales
- Family: Mortierellaceae
- Genus: Echinochlamydosporium X.Z.Jiang, H.Y.Yu, M.C.Xiang, X.Y.Liu & X.Z.Liu (2011)

Type species
- Echinochlamydosporium variabile X.Z.Jiang, H.Y.Yu, M.C.Xiang, X.Y.Liu & X.Z.Liu (2011)

Single-species genus of fungi

Echinochlamydosporium is a fungal genus in the Mortierellaceae family of the Zygomycota. The genus is monotypic, containing the single species Echinochlamydosporium variabile, found in China. The fungus grows on juvenile individuals of the soybean cyst nematode (Heterodera glycines).
