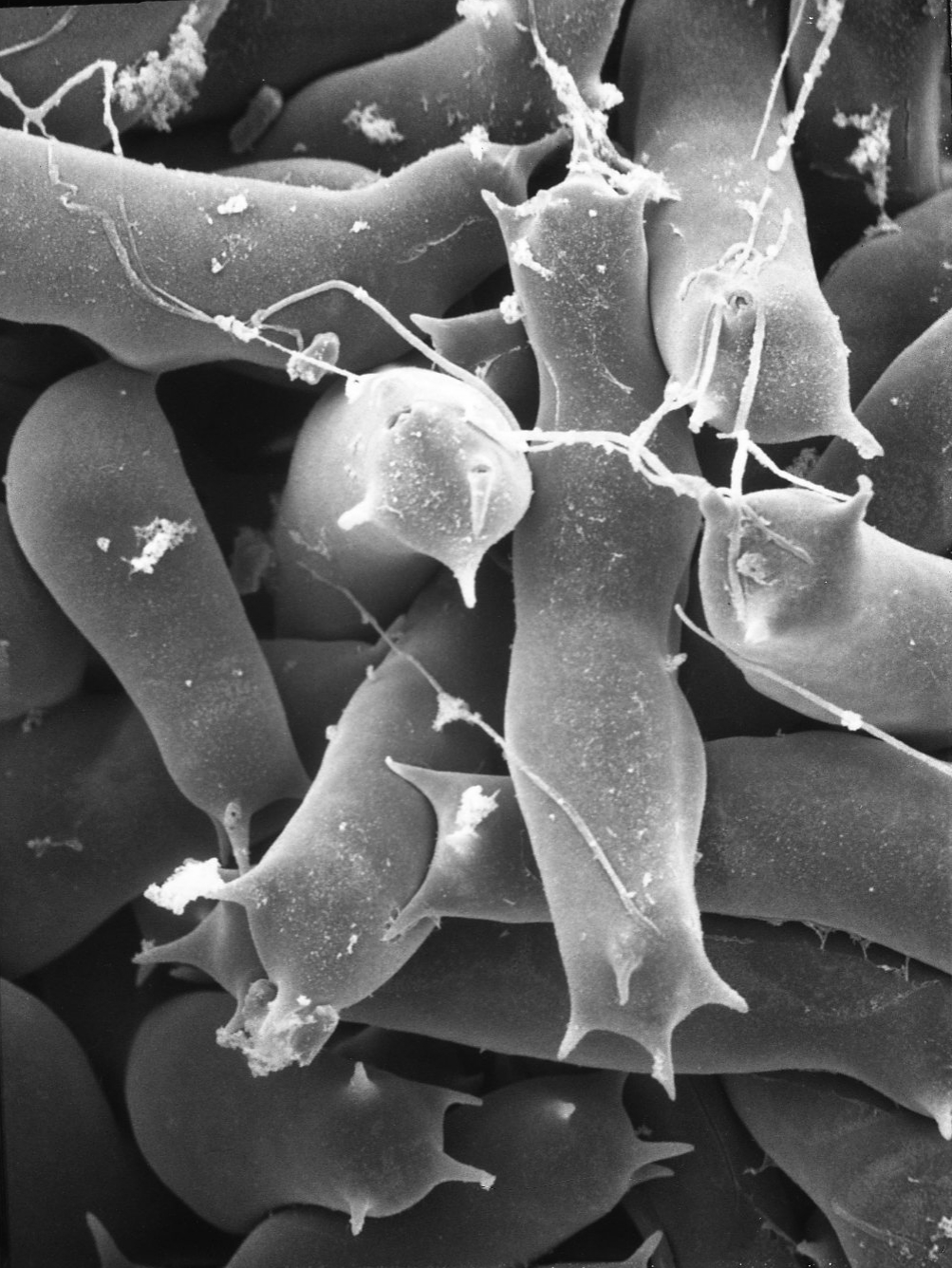
- Electromicrograph of Lobosporangium transversalis

Scientific classification
- Domain: Eukaryota
- Kingdom: Fungi
- Division: Mucoromycota
- Class: Mortierellomycetes
- Order: Mortierellales
- Family: Mortierellaceae
- Genus: Lobosporangium; M.Blackw. & Benny (2004)
- Species: L. transversale

Binomial name
- Lobosporangium transversale (Malloch) M.Blackw. & Benny (2004)

= Lobosporangium =

Single-species genus of fungi

Lobosporangium is a fungal genus in the Mortierellaceae family of the Zygomycota. The genus is monotypic, containing the single species Lobosporangium transversale, found in the US and Mexico.
