= Gamsiella =

Scientific classification
- Kingdom: Fungi
- Phylum: Mortierellomycota
- Class: Mortierellomycetes
- Order: Mortierellales
- Family: Mortierellaceae
- Genus: Gamsiella (R.K.Benj.) Benny & M.Blackw. (2004)

Type species
- Gamsiella multidivaricata (R.K.Benj.) Benny & M.Blackw. (2004)

Synonyms
- Mortierella subgen. Gamsiella R.K.Benj. (1978)

Genus of fungi

Gamsiella is a fungal genus in the Mortierellaceae family.

The genus name of Gamsiella is in honour of Konrad Walter Gams (1934—2017), who was an Austrian botanist and scientist.

The genus was circumscribed by Gerald Leonard Benny and Meredith Blackwell in Mycologia Vol.96 (Issue 1) on page 147 in 2004.
