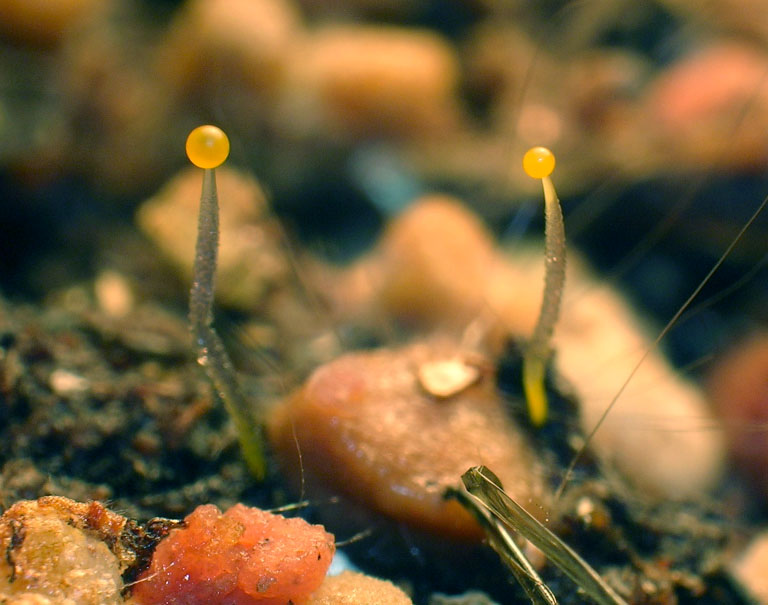
- Phycomyces

Scientific classification
- Kingdom: Fungi
- Subkingdom: Mucoromyceta; Tedersoo et al. 2018

Divisions and subdivisions
- Calcarisporiellomycota; Calcarisporiellomycotina; Glomeromycota; Glomeromycotina; Mortierellomycota; Mortierellomycotina; Mucoromycota; Mucoromycotina

= Mucoromyceta =

Subkingdom of fungi

Mucoromyceta is a subkingdom of fungi which includes the divisions Calcarisporiellomycota, Glomeromycota, Mortierellomycota and Mucoromycota. This enormous group includes almost all molds.

Sources published prior to Tedersoo et al. 2018 refer to this taxon as a phylum Mucoromycota, with three subphyla. In a 2016 study using this older treatement of "Mucoromycota" equivalent to current Mucoromyceta, the group appears as sister to Dikarya.

Informally known as zygomycetes I, Mucoromyceta includes Mucoromycotina, Mortierellomycotina, and Glomeromycotina, and consists of mainly mycorrhizal fungi, root endophytes, and plant decomposers. Mucoromycotina and Glomeromycotina can form mycorrhiza-like relationships with nonvascular plants. Mucoromyceta contain multiple mycorrhizal lineages, root endophytes, and decomposers of plant-based carbon sources. Mucoromycotina species known as mycoparasites, or putative parasites of arthropods are like saprobes. When Mucoromyceta infect animals, they are seen as opportunistic pathogens. Mucoromycotina are fast-growing fungi and early colonizers of carbon-rich substrates. Mortierellomycotina are common soil fungi that occur as root endophytes of woody plants and are isolated as saprobes. Glomeromycotina live in soil, forming a network of hyphae, but depend on organic carbon from host plants. In exchange, the arbuscular mycorrhizal fungi provide nutrients to the plant.

== Description ==
Molds in this group have a stalk which at the top has a caplike structure that includes the spores.

== Reproduction ==
Known reproduction states of Mucoromyceta are zygospore production and asexual reproduction. Zygospores can have decorations on their surface and range up to several millimeters in diameter. Asexual reproduction typically involves the production of sporangiospores or chlamydospores. Multicellular sporcaps are present within Mucoromycotina, Mortierellomycotina and as aggregations of spore-producing in species of Glomeromycotina. Shown in Mucorales, sexual reproduction is under the control of mating type genes, sexP and sexM, which regulate the production of pheromones required for the maturation of hyphae into gametangia. The sexP gene is expressed during vegetative growth and matting, while the sexM gene is expressed during mating. Sexual reproduction in Glomeromycotina is unknown, although its occurrence is inferred from genomic studies. However, specialized hyphae produce chlamydospore-like spores asexually; these may be borne at terminal (apical) or lateral positions on the hyphae, or intercalary (formed within the hypha, between sub-apical cells). Species of Glomeromycotina produce coenocytic hyphae that can have bacterial endosymbionts. Mortierellomycotina reproduce asexually by sporangia that either lack or have a reduced columella, which support the sporangium. Species of Mortierellomycotina only form microscopic colonies, but some make multicellular sporocarps. Mucoromycotina sexual reproduction is by prototypical zygospore formation and asexual reproduction and involves the large production of sporangia.

== Morphology ==
Mucoromycotina contain discoidal hemispherical spindle pole bodies. Although spindle pole bodies function as microtubule organizing centers, they lack remnants of the centrioles' characteristic 9+2 microtubule arrangement. Species of Mucoromycotina and Mortierellomycotina produce large-diameter, coenocytic hyphae. Glomeromycotina also form coenocytic hyphae with highly branched, narrow hyphal arbuscules in host cells. When septations occur in Mucoromyceta they are formed at the base of reproductive structures.

== Production of lipids, polyphosphates, and carotenoids ==
Mucoromyceta's metabolism can utilize many substrates that are from various nitrogen and phosphorus resources to produce lipids, chitin, polyphosphates, and carotenoids. They have been found to co-produce metabolites in a single fermentation process like polyphosphates and lipids. The overproduction of chitin from Mucoromyceta fungi can be accomplished by limiting inorganic phosphorus and promoting acidic conditions. Mucoromyceta are capable of accumulating high amounts of lipids in their cell biomass, which allows the fungi to produce polyunsaturated fatty acids and carotenoids. They have been found to induce antimicrobial activity from fungal crude total lipids. The high production of lipids from Mucoromyceta have the potential for use in biodiesel production.

== Gallery ==
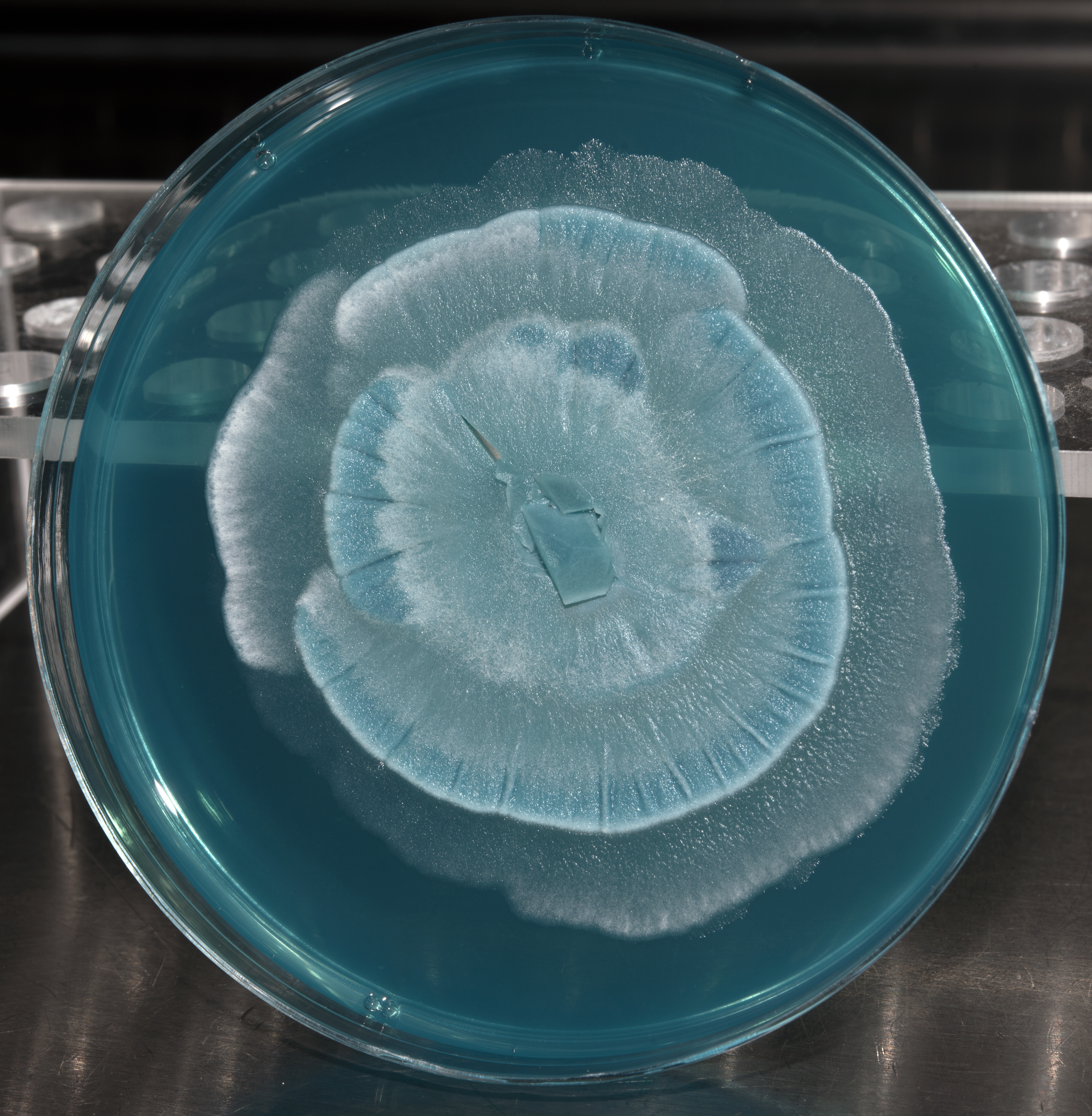
Mortierella from Yosemite

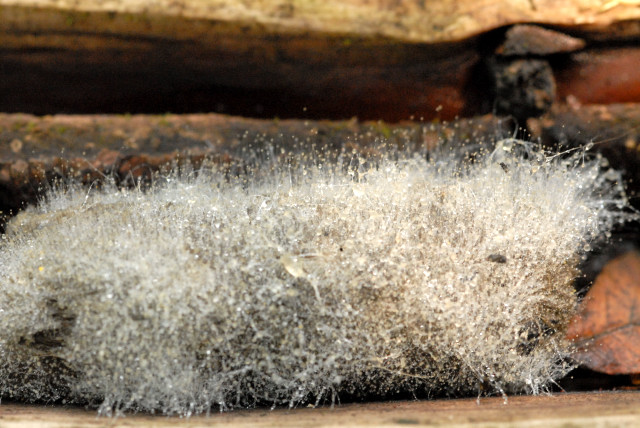
Mucor

== See also ==
- Mucor circinelloides
