= Dissophora =

Scientific classification
- Domain: Eukaryota
- Kingdom: Fungi
- Division: Mucoromycota
- Class: Mortierellomycetes
- Order: Mortierellales
- Family: Mortierellaceae
- Genus: Dissophora; Thaxt. (1914)

Type species
- Dissophora decumbens Thaxt. (1914)

Species
- D. decumbens D. nadsonii D. ornata

Genus of fungi

Dissophora is a genus of fungi in the Mortierellaceae family of the Mucoromycota. The genus is widespread in north temperate regions and contains three species. Dissophora was circumscribed by American mycologist Roland Thaxter in 1914.
