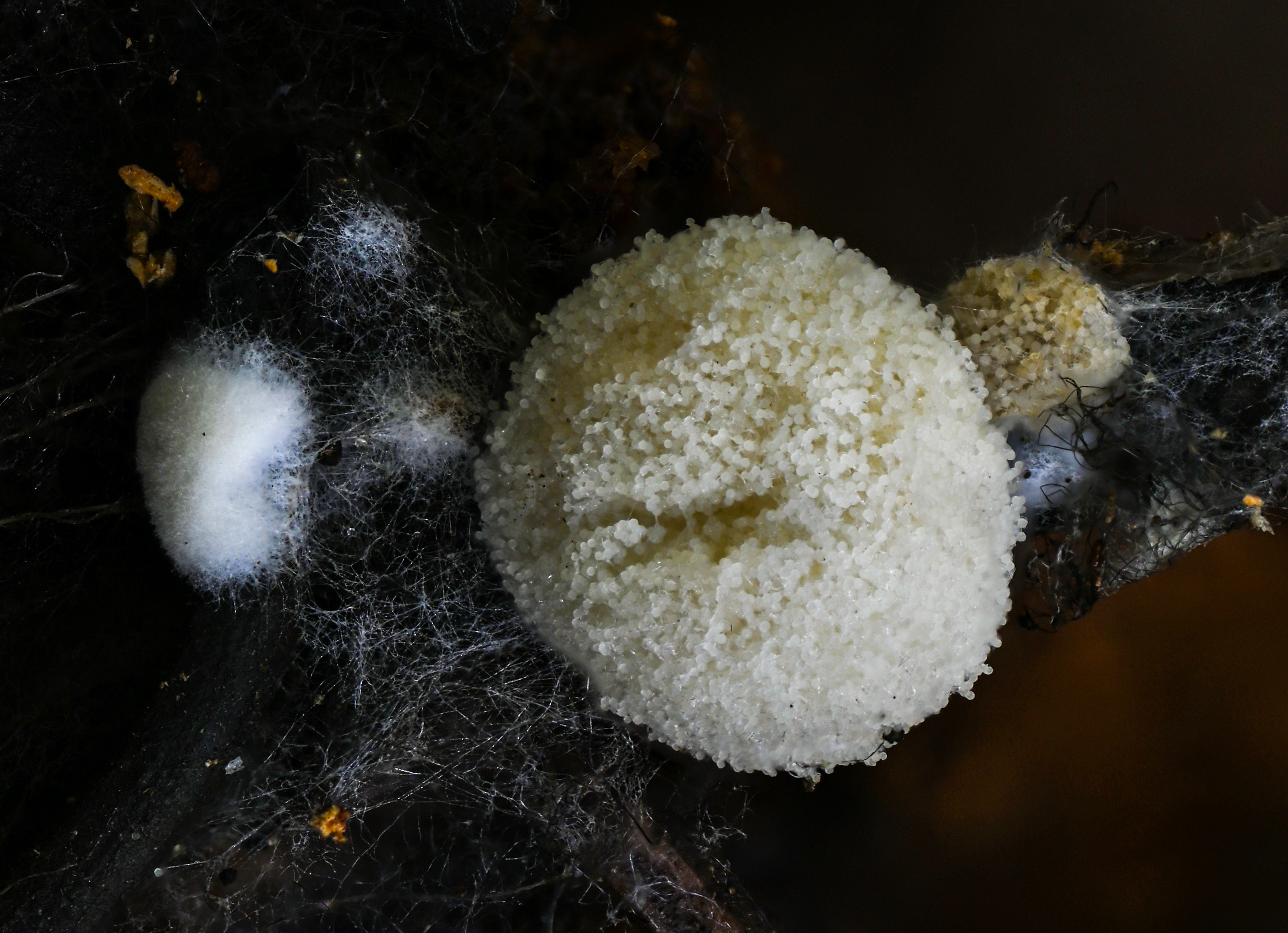
- Modicella malleola from California

Scientific classification
- Domain: Eukaryota
- Kingdom: Fungi
- Division: Mucoromycota
- Class: Mortierellomycetes
- Order: Mortierellales
- Family: Mortierellaceae
- Genus: Modicella; Kanouse (1936)

Type species
- Modicella malleola (Harkn.) Gerd. & Trappe (1974)

Species
- M. albostipitata M. malleola M. reniformis

= Modicella =

Genus of fungi

Modicella is a genus of fungi in the family Mortierellaceae of the Mucoromycota. It was formerly in the division Zygomycota. The genus contains two species found in North and South America and one in New Zealand.
