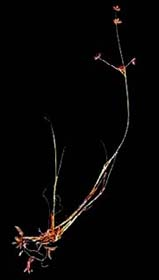
- Galls on the roots of Juncus articulatus induced by Entorrhiza casparyana

Scientific classification
- Kingdom: Fungi
- Clade: Amastigomycota
- Subkingdom: Dikarya; Bauer (2015)
- Division: Entorrhizomycota; Tedersoo, Sánchez-Ramírez, Kõljalg, Bahram, M. Döring, Schigel, T.W. May, M. Ryberg & Abarenkov (2018)
- Class: Entorrhizomycetes; Begerow, Stoll & R.Bauer (2007)

Type genus
- Entorrhiza C.A.Weber (1884)

Orders
- Entorrhizales; Talbotiomycetales

Synonyms
- Entorrhizomycetidae Bauer & Oberwinkler 1997

= Entorrhizomycetes =

Class of fungi

Entorrhizomycetes is the sole class in the phylum Entorrhizomycota, within the Fungi subkingdom Dikarya along with Basidiomycota and Ascomycota. It contains three genera and is a small group of teliosporic root parasites that form galls on plants in the Juncaceae (rush) and Cyperaceae (sedge) families. Prior to 2015 this phylum was placed under the subdivision Ustilaginomycotina. A 2015 study did a "comprehensive five-gene analyses" of Entorrhiza and concluded that the former class Entorrhizomycetes is possibly either a close sister group to the rest of Dikarya or Basidiomycota.

== Taxonomy ==
Taxonomy based on the work of Wijayawardene et al. 2019.

- Order Talbotiomycetales Riess et al. 2015
  - Family Talbotiomycetaceae Riess et al. 2015
    - Genus Talbotiomyces Vánky, Bauer & Begerow 2007
- Order Entorrhizales Bauer & Oberwinkler 1997
  - Family Entorrhizaceae Bauer & Oberwinkler 1997
    - Genus Juncorrhiza Riess & Piątek 2019
    - Genus Entorrhiza Weber 1884 [Schinzia Nägeli 1842]

== Morphology ==
All members of Entorrhizomycetes are obligate parasites on the roots of plants. Sori are produced as galls on the roots of hosts. Galls are tubercular with a globoid, irregular or elongated shape and are composed of vascular bundles, parenchymatous cells and fungal mycelium. Younger segments of the galls are pale in color whilst older segments turn brown. Mycelium consists of dikaryotic and septate hyphae with fibrillate walls that lack clamp connections. Initially, the mycelium grows intercellularily before producing coiled intracellular hyphae terminating in globose cells that detach and develop into teliospores. Teliospores germinate into tetrads through internal septation, and each tetrad compartment produce hyphae that terminate in sigmoid propagules. Bauer et al. noted that young teliospores have two nuclei, older teliospores have only one nucleus, and each tetrad compartment has one nucelus each. This indicates that karyogamy and meiosis occurs in the teliospore. It has been observed that teliospores are liberated when the host plant dies and the galls disintegrate, and that the number of galls is higher in waterlogged soils compared to well-drained soils. These observations might support the hypothesis that entorrhizomycetes disperse through soil moisture.

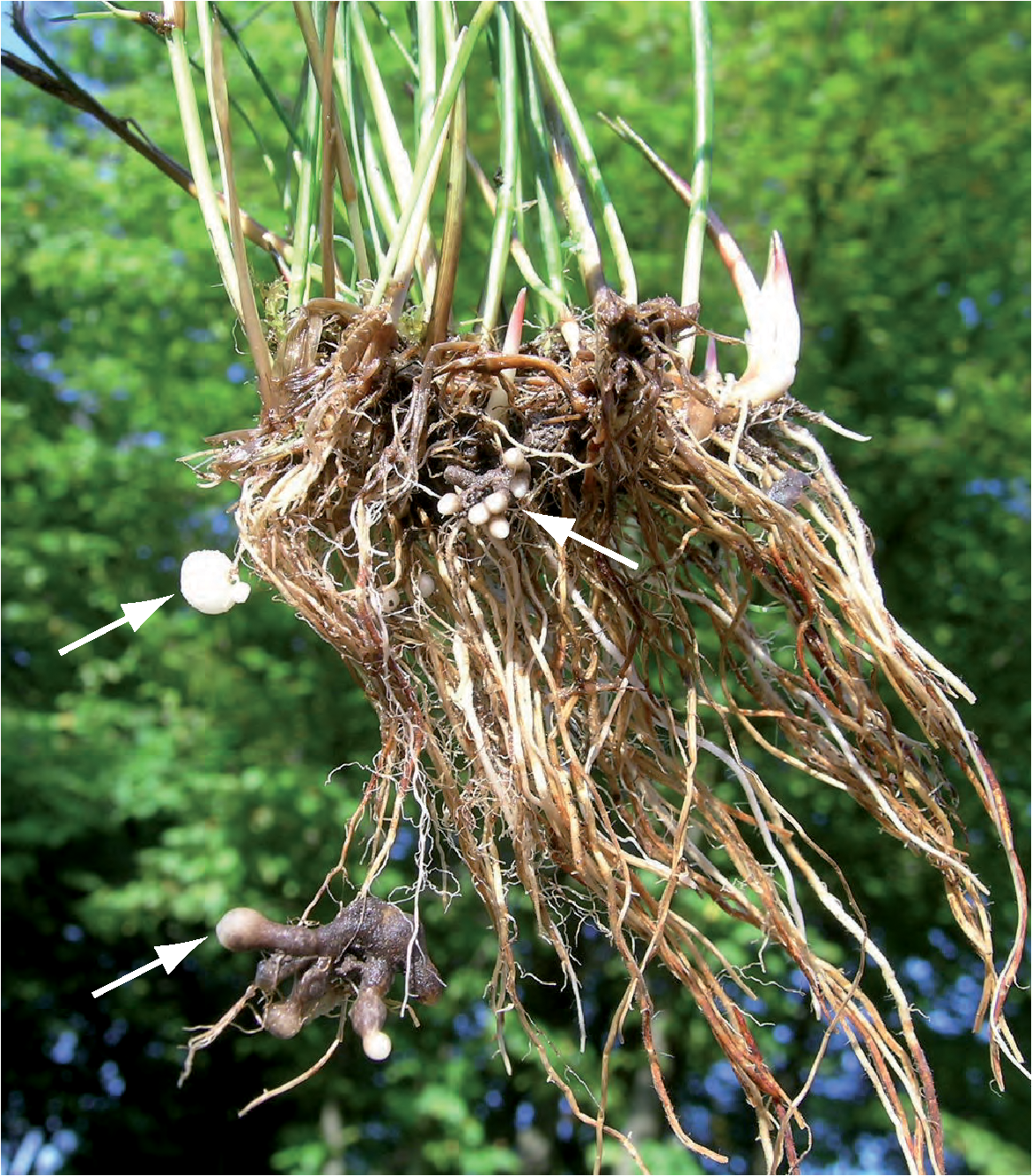
Juncus articulatus with root galls caused by Juncorrhiza casparyana (arrows).

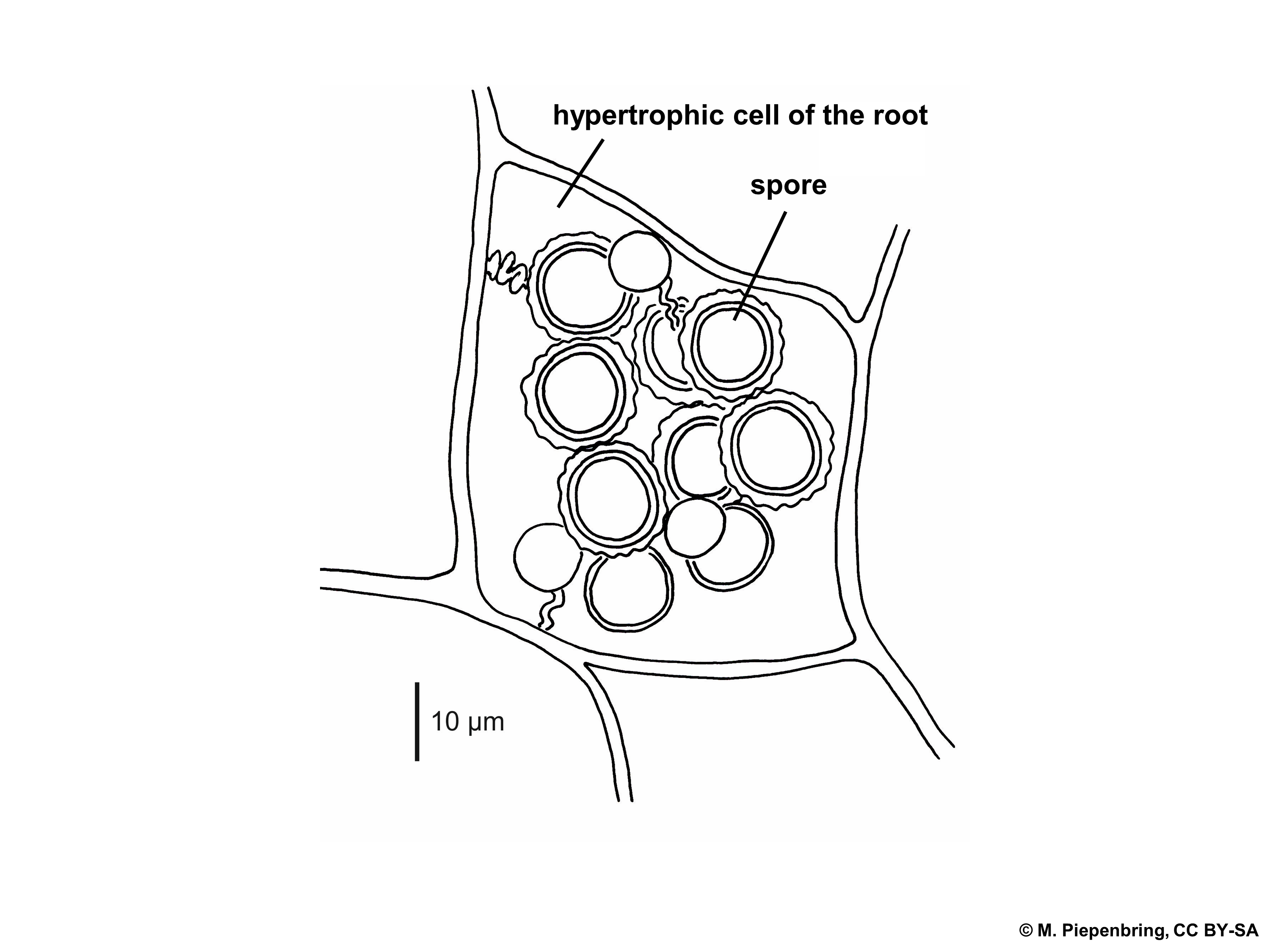
Juncorrhiza sp. hyphae and teliospores in living host cell.

Both Talbotiomyces and Juncorrhiza are segregate taxa from Entorrhiza sensu lato. Entorrhiza sensu stricto is diagnosed by teliospores with longitudinally ridged or cerebriform ornamentation and infecting plants belonging to Cyperaceae, whilst Juncorrhiza is diagnosed by teliospores with verrucose-tuberculate ornamentation and infecting plants belonging to Juncaceae. Talbotiomyces is distinguished from species in Entorrhizales by hyphal septa with simple pores that lack caps or membranes (species in Entorrhizales have dolipores that lack caps or membranes) and infecting plants belonging to Caryophyllales.

== Evolution ==
Molecular phylogeny place Entorrhizomycetes as either a sister group to Basidiomycota or a sister group to Dikarya as a whole. Entorrhizomycetes share many traits with basidiomycetes such as dikaryotic vegetative mycelium, fibrillate cell walls, hyphal septa with a tripartite profile, and similarities in the spindle pole body. Bauer et al. speculated that the teliospore tetrad in entorrhizomycetes might represent the ancestral state of dikaryan meiosporangia. This is based on the observation that the septa in the tetrads have pores, and that the tetrad compartments germinate into hyphae terminating in propagules. The basidial cells separated by pored septa in basidiomycete phragmobasidia represent meiospores that in turn release vegetative propagules (that are usually characterised as basidiospores). It is possible that an ancestral structure similar to the teliospore tetrad evolved into phragmobasidia which in turn evolved into holobasidia on multiple occasions during the transition from water-dispersal to air-dispersal. If entorrhizomycetes are sister to Dikarya, it is also possible that the teliospore tetrad is homologous to the meiospore tetrads of early-diverging ascomycetes.

The stem age of the Entorrhizomycota has been estimated to approximately 560 Mya during the late Neoproterozoic era. Divergence between Talbotiomycetales and Entorrhizales is estimated to approximately 50 Mya, and divergence between Entorrhiza and Juncorrhiza is estimated to approximately 42 Mya. Both Entorrhiza and Juncorrhiza underwent a major radiation during the Oligocene and Miocene epochs. Given that these divergence estimates are incongruent or only slightly congruent with the estimated stem ages of the host plant lineages, and incongruence in the co-phylogeny between Entorrhizales and host plants, host-shift speciation is more likely to have occurred than co-speciation during these divergences and the radiation of Entorrhizales.

Entorrhizomycetes have much lower number of species and more limited host range than their estimated age would indicate. One possible explanation is that many lineages have gone extinct along with their hosts during mass extinction events in the past. Another explanation is that much of the diversity in this phylum remains undiscovered. The latter explanation is supported by the fact that host plants show no aboveground symptoms of infection, and there may be species that do not cause galls on their hosts.
