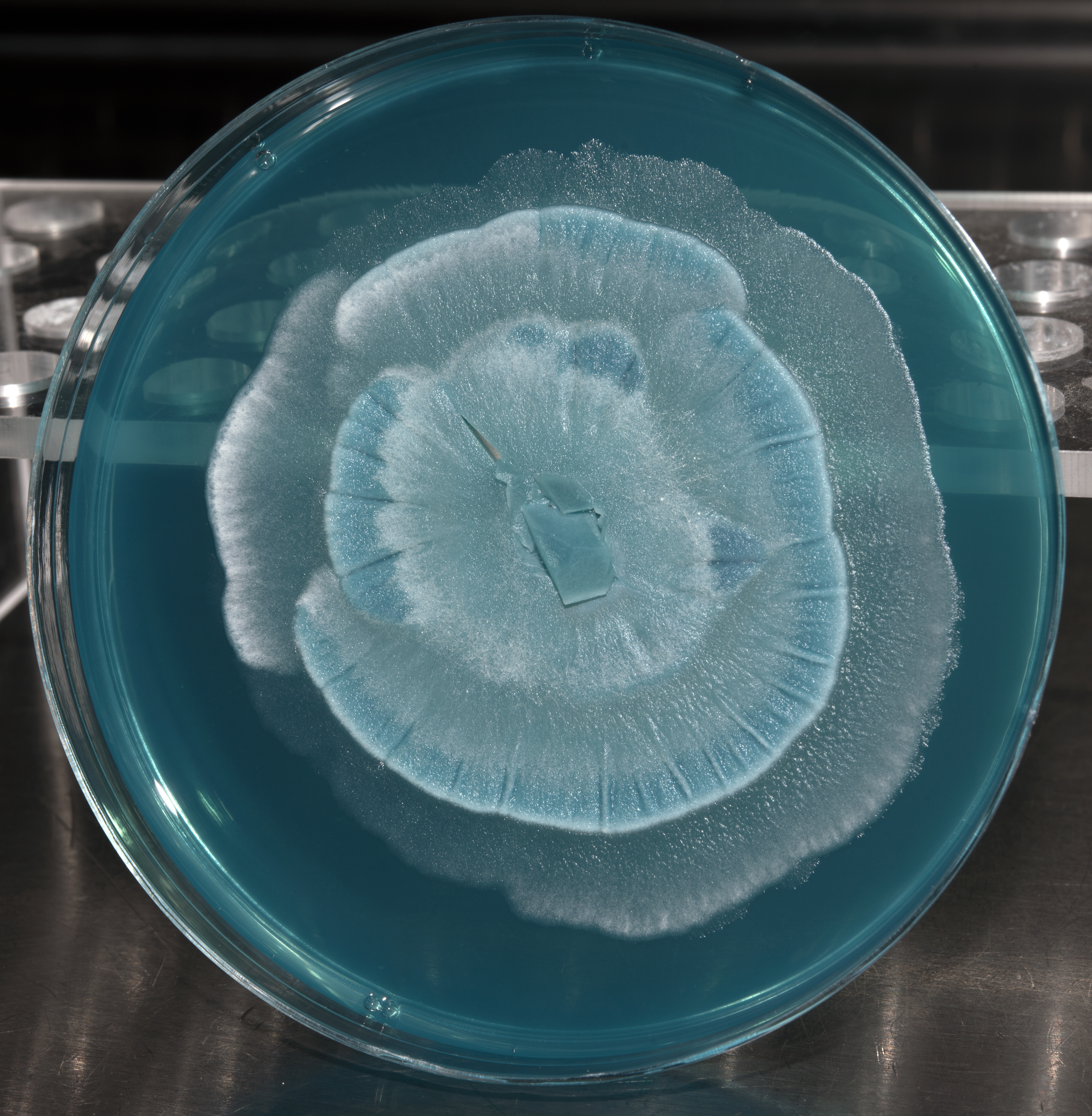

Scientific classification
- Kingdom: Fungi
- Phylum: Mortierellomycota
- Class: Mortierellomycetes
- Order: Mortierellales
- Family: Mortierellaceae
- Genus: Mortierella; Coem. (1863)

Type species
- Mortierella polycephala Coem. (1863)

Species
- List of Mortierella species

Synonyms
- Actinomortierella Chalab. (1968); Carnoya Dewèvre (1893); Naumoviella Novot. (1950)

= Mortierella =

Genus of fungi

Mortierella species are soil fungi belonging to the order Mortierellales within the subphylum Mortierellomycotina (phylum: Mucoromycota). The widespread genus contains about 85 species.

== Taxonomy ==
The genus name of Mortierella is in honour of the Belgian Barthélemy Dumortier (1797–1878), a botanist and Member of Parliament.

The genus was circumscribed by Henri Eugène Lucien Gaëtan Coemans.

== Ecology ==
Most species of Mortierella live as saprotrophs in soil, on decaying leaves and other organic material. Some species live on faecal pellets or on exoskeletons of arthropods. Penicillium, Trichoderma, Mucor and Mortierella species belong to an ecology group which are the first organisms growing on roots. G. A. Salt described that the frequency of Mortierella species growing on the surface of roots from spruce is higher in comparison to other species (e.g. Fusarium, Pythium). One species of Mortierella lives in marine habitats.

== Morphology ==
Mortierella fungi are typically coenocytic, but compared with the genus Mucor (Mucoromycotina, Mucorales), they have a stronger tendency towards septum formation. Compared with Mucor-like fungi, the mitosporangia are typically smaller, contain fewer spores and lack a columella. Many Mortierella-like fungi are asexual. However, if zygospores are found, they strongly resemble Mucor-zygospores. Sometimes sexual structures are embedded in loosely arranged hyphal networks.

== Metabolism ==
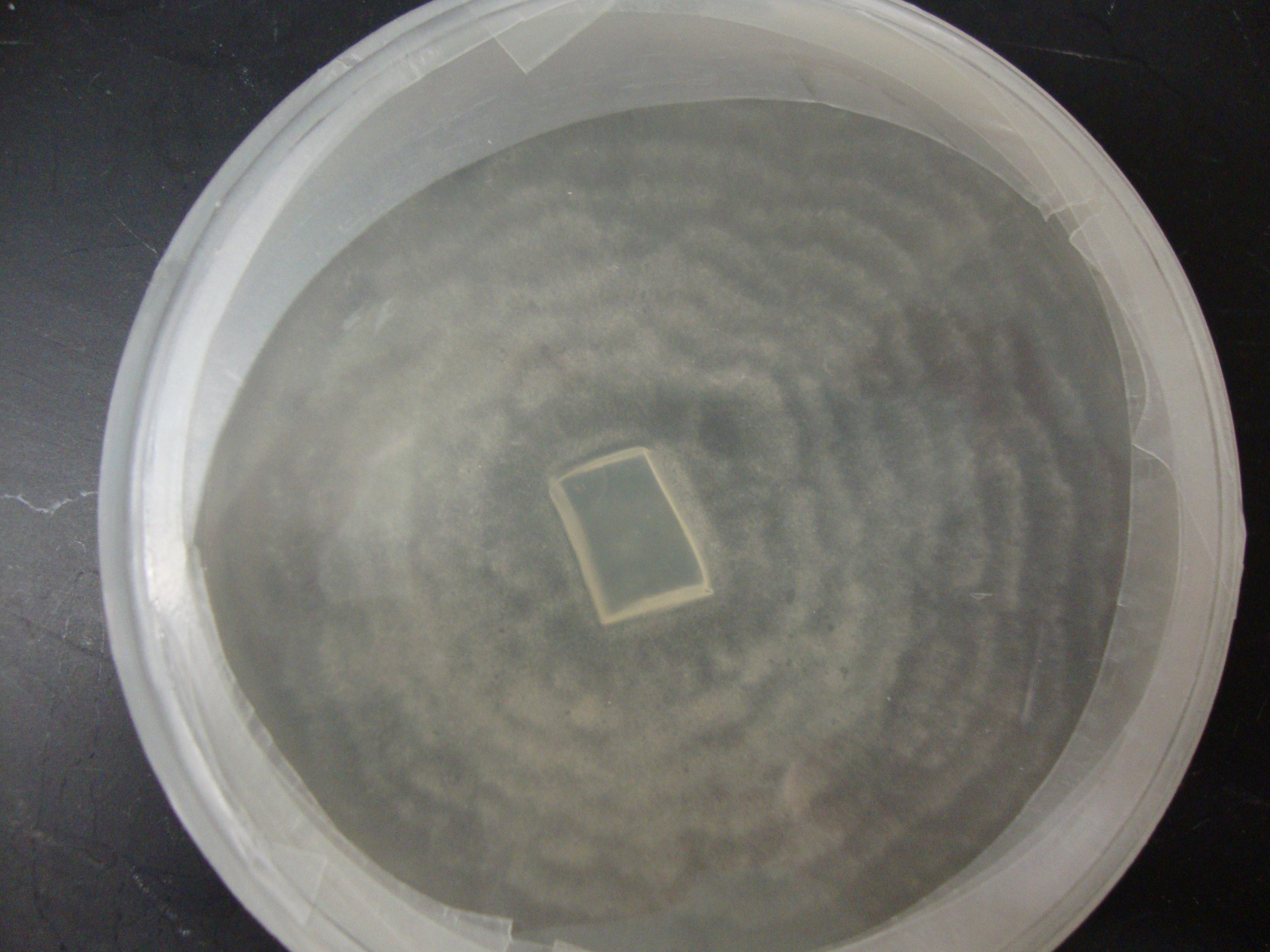
This is a culture of Mortierella, which is a zygomycete. The view is from the bottom to demonstrate the zonate growth that is characteristic of this genus.

Mortierella can grow on yeast extract, fish meal, or other media rich in nutrients. Most laboratories grow these fungi on potato dextrose agar or maize meal agar. The genus can also grow on PARP media, which is used as a common selective medium for Pythium. Because of its similar appearance to Pythium in culture, separation of the two can be difficult until sporulation occurs. Cultivation and growth of Mortierella fungi are affected by the carbon source, addition of minerals and nitrogen source. Monosaccharides are most frequently used for the growth. Yeast extract and soybean meal are widely used as nitrogen source. Especially the balance between carbon and nitrogen in the medium influences the fungal culture.

Many Mortierella spp. are chitinolytic. Experiments show that they degrade chitin nearly as efficiently as chitinolytic actinomycetes. From some Mortierella species it is also known that they are able to degrade hemicelluloses to sugar by using the enzyme xylanase. This fungus can degrade the hemicellulose from plants to get sugars for their growth.

== Sexual and asexual development ==
Mortierella development — asexual (top), sexual (bottom)

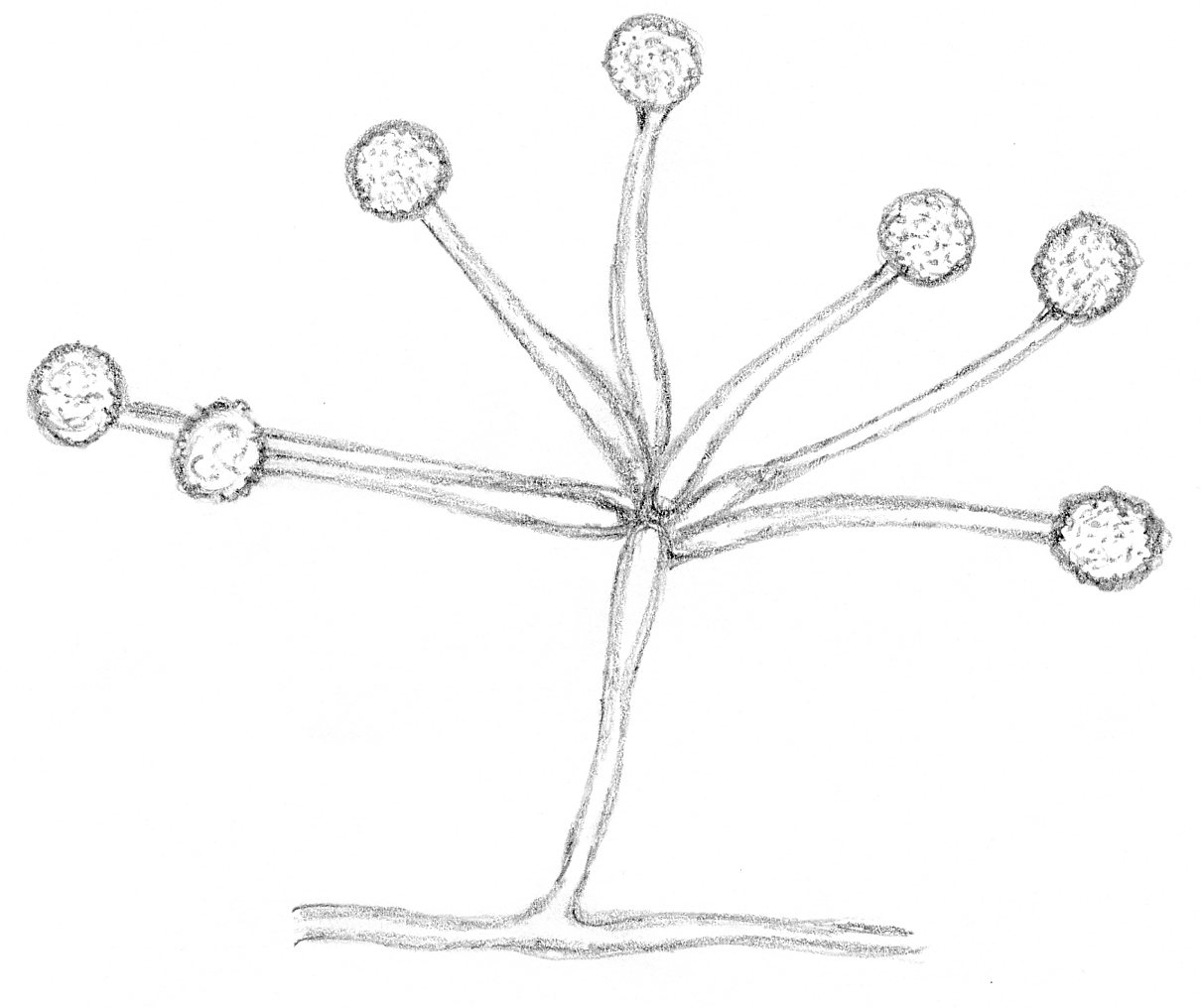
Branched mito-sporangiophores

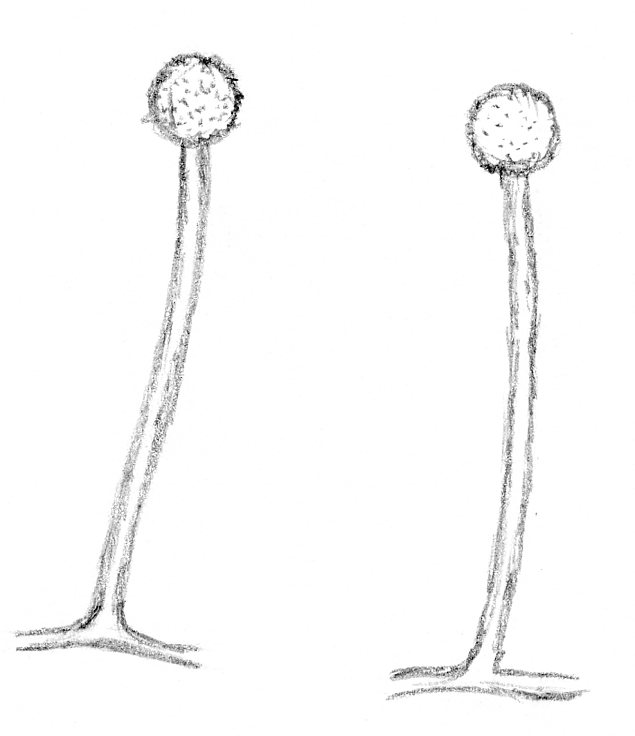
Unbranched mito-sporangiophores

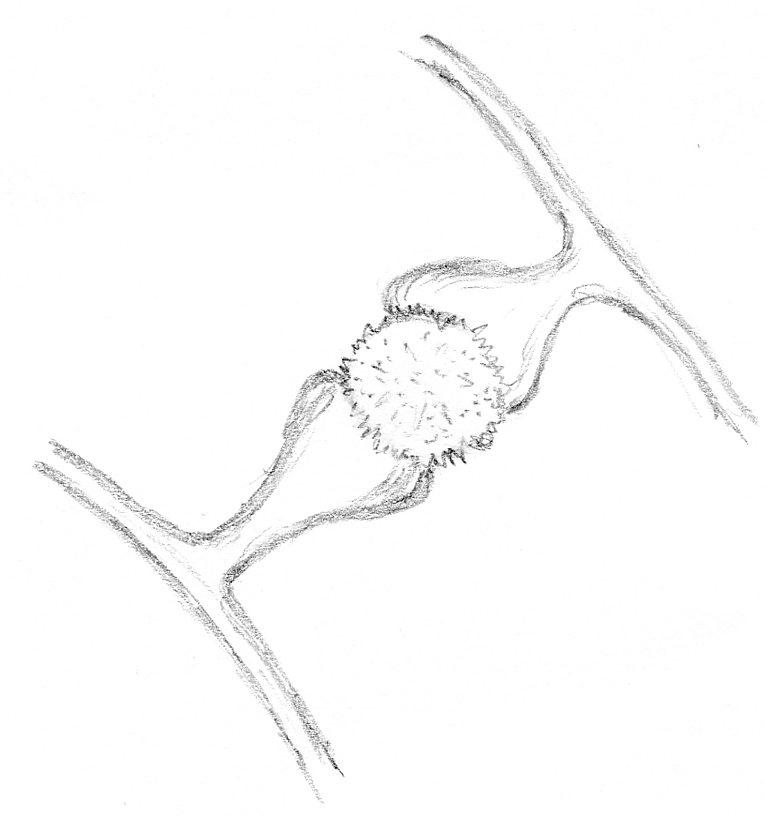
Naked meiospore

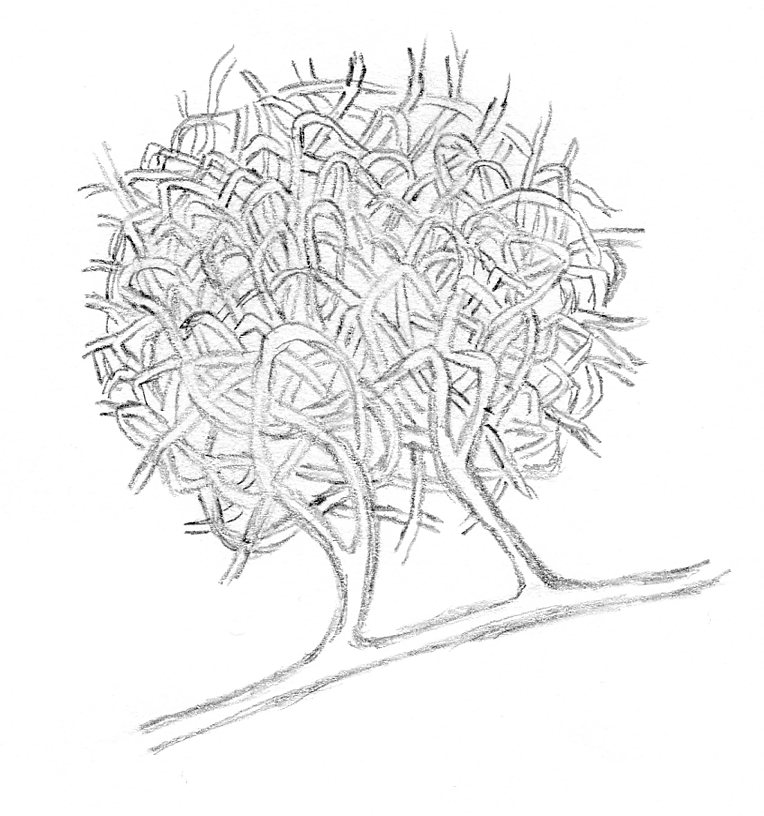
Nested meiospore

Some Mortierella species show sexual developmental programs in addition to mitotic reproduction.

Mortierella forms zygospores that are the developmental consequence of plasmogamy between gametangia belonging to complementary mating types. The zygospores of Mortierella spp. may be naked or surrounded by sterile hyphae that form a nest-like structure, which may be interpreted as evolutionary early fruiting bodies.

Some Mortierella species are homothallic (M. epigama, M. parvispora, M. nigrescens, M. rostafinskii, M. polycephala, M.renispora), but most are heterothallic (M. elongata, M. marburgensis, M. umbellata, M. capitata, M. indohi). The species Mortierella alpina was found to be homothallic and to form zygospores with a hyphal coat. Most Mortierella species have been found to be heterothallic and to produce naked zygospores with unequal suspensors.

Very often sexual structures differ in size between mating types. The smaller suspensor, progametangium or gametangium does not enlarge during sexual development and may disappear soon after plasmogamy. The early development of such heterogametangic zygospores is illustrated in the heterothallic species, M. umbellata. In this species, hyphal coiling occurs at the contact site of sexually compatible mycelia. This is followed by development of progametangia which grow in parallel and close to each other. At the end of this development, one partner, the macroprogametangium will be larger than the other, the microprogametangium.

== Biotechnology ==
Umbelopsis isabellina, which used to be mis-classified as Mortierella isabellina, produces γ-linolenic acid, an important poly-unsaturated fatty acid. It was re-classified as belonging to the genus Umbelopsis in part based on its fatty acid profile, in addition to classical ribosomal DNA sequencing. Various poly-unsaturated fatty acids including arachidonic acid are produced by Mortierella alpina. Poly-unsaturated fatty acids contain two or more double bonds and are the acyl components of cellular lipids. Today, long-chain poly-unsaturated fatty acids are regarded as substances with beneficial potential in pharmaceutic and nutritional applications. They also serve a wide variety of purposes, from being a purely structural element in phospholipids to being involved in signal transduction, and as a substrate for a host of derivatives involved in second messenger function. Many species of the genus Mortierella have been found to yield exceptionally high quantities of arachidonic acid depending on the fermentation media and culture conditions. Fatty acids are normally produced in submerged culture with high carbon source supply, although this technique has drawbacks with respect to energy consumption and waste water production. In the long run, fatty acid fermentation needs to be done under economically reasonable solid-state fermentation conditions.

== Pathogenicity ==
Mortierella species are usually non-pathogenic for plants or animals and humans. A rare example for a pathogen is Mortierella wolfii, which is until now the only pathogen of humans and other animals. Mortierella wolfii, normally isolated from soil, rotten silage and similar substrates, causes bovine abortion, pneumonia and systemic mycosis.
