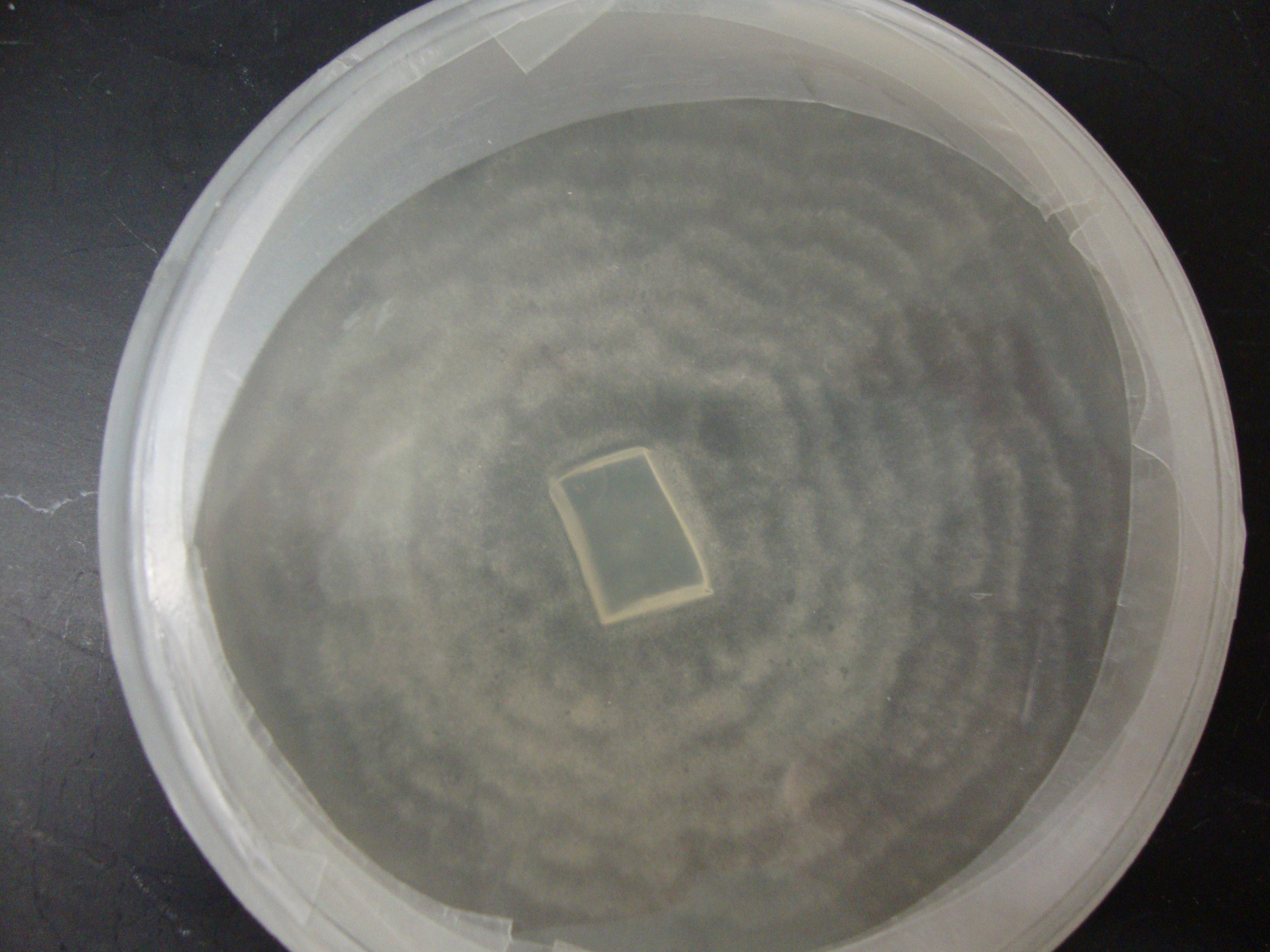
- Reverse perspective of a culture, demonstrating the zonate growth characteristic of this genus.

Scientific classification
- Kingdom: Fungi
- Phylum: Mortierellomycota
- Class: Mortierellomycetes
- Order: Mortierellales
- Family: Mortierellaceae; A.Fisch. (1892)

Type genus
- Mortierella Coem. (1863)

Genera
- Aquamortierella; Dissophora; Gamsiella; Lobosporangium; Modicella; Mortierella

= Mortierellaceae =

Family of fungi

The Mortierellaceae are a family of fungi in the order Mortierellales. The family contains six genera and 93 species.

== Taxonomic history ==
Many genera have been included in this family. According to Fitzpatrick, the family contained Mortierella, Herpocladium, Dissophora, and Haplosporangium. Later, Herpocladium was removed and Aquamortierella added. Another genus, Echinosporangium, was later added. Currently, the family contains Mortierella, which may be paraphyletic compared to other genera, the bitypic (containing only two species) Dissophora and Modicella, and the monotypic (containing only one species) genera Aquamortierella, Lobosporangium, and Gamsiella. A new genus, Echinochlamydosporium, was described in 2011. In 2018, due to DNA analysis, Echinochlamydosporium was transferred to the Calcarisporiellaceae family.

== Morphology ==
Members of this family have coenocytic hyphae. Colonies tend to be white or off-white and are characterized by zonate growth—that is, growing in rings—and an onion or garlic smell. Single or multiple columellate sporangia are born on aerial sporangiophores. Their distinctive zygospores may be enveloped by hyphae. They may be smooth or dimples but nearly all have apposed suspensors. This family also produces chlamydospores, which may be spiny or rough and thick-walled.

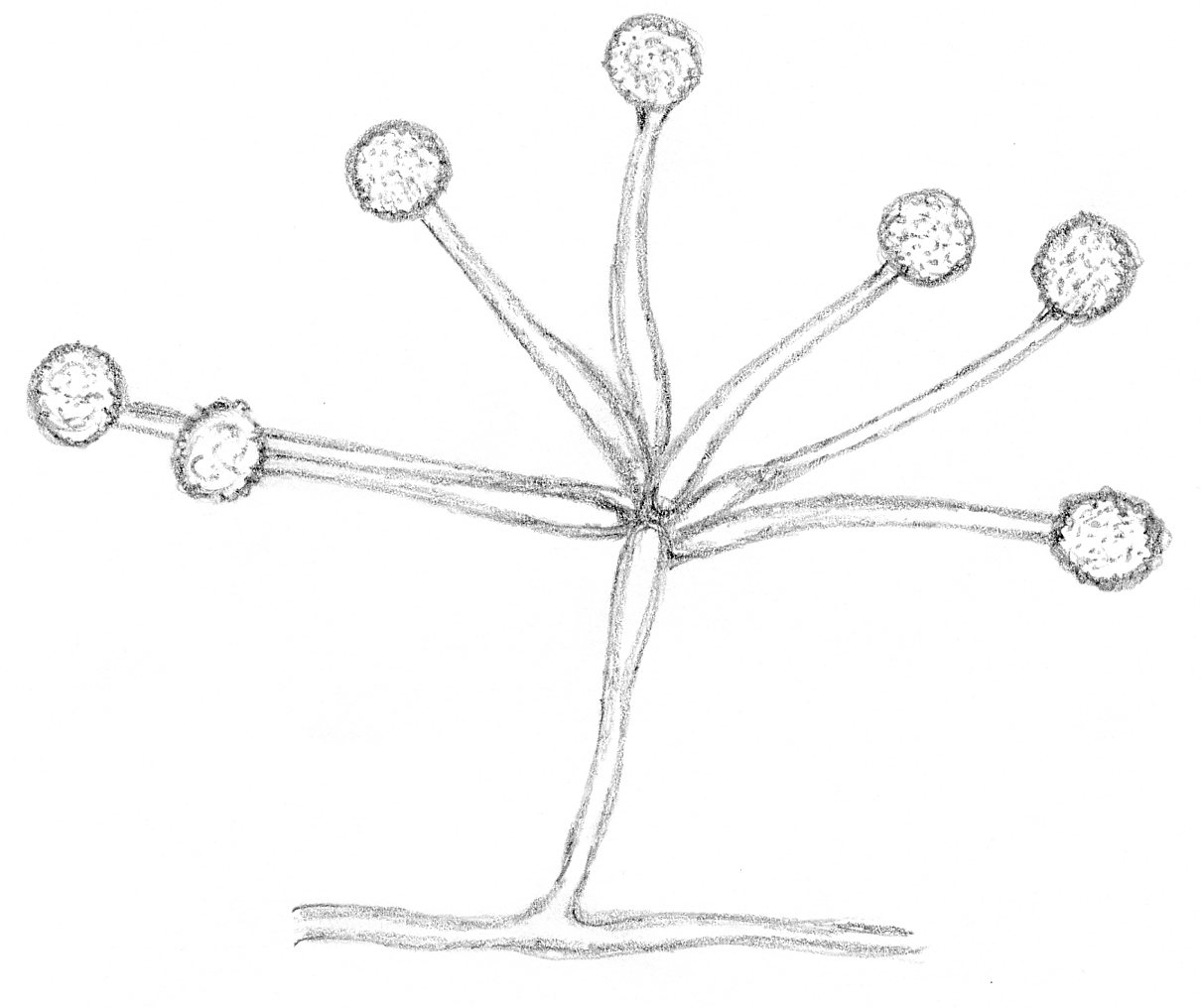
Fig 1 A Mortierella : Branched mito-sporangiophores

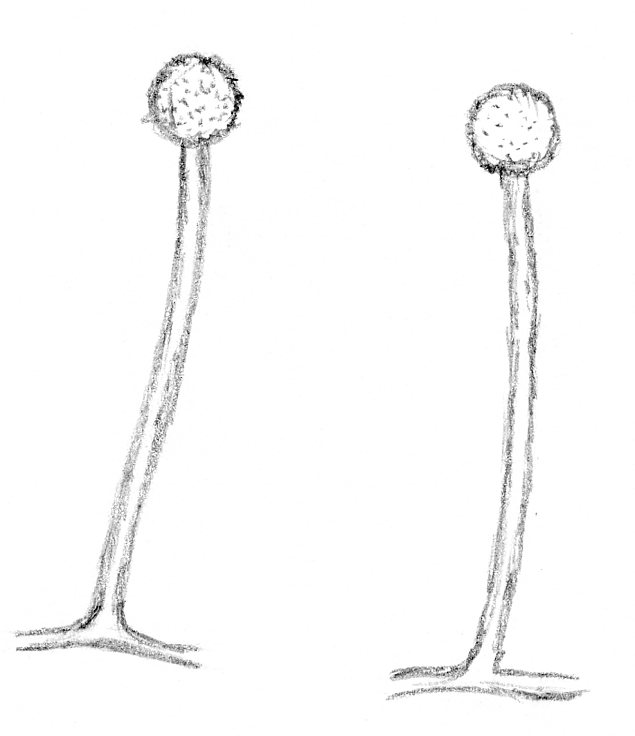
Fig 1 B Mortierella : Unbranched mito-sporangiophores

Asexual Development

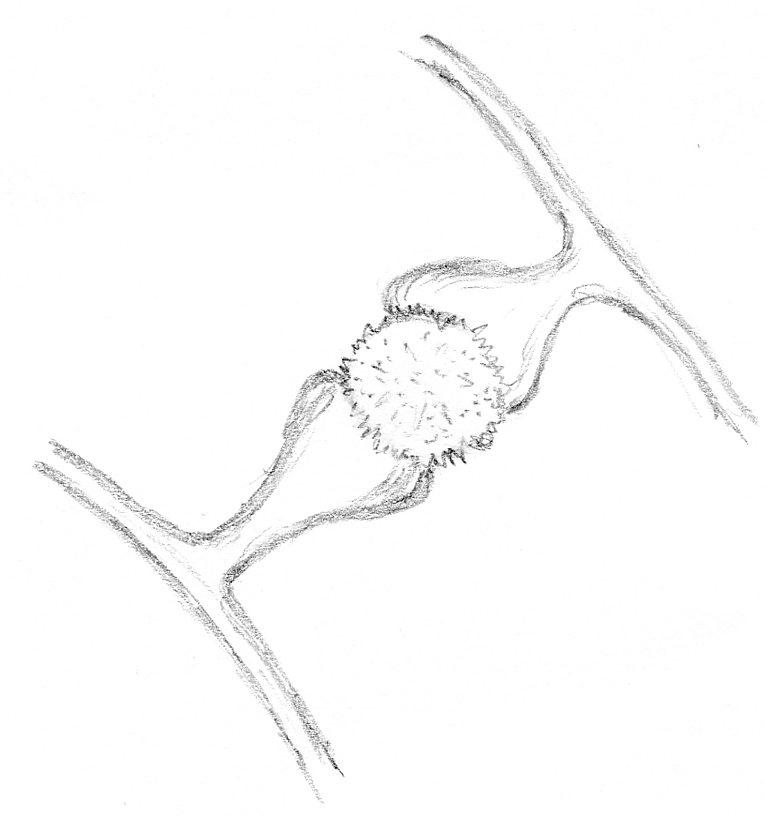
Fig 2 A Mortierella : Naked meiospore

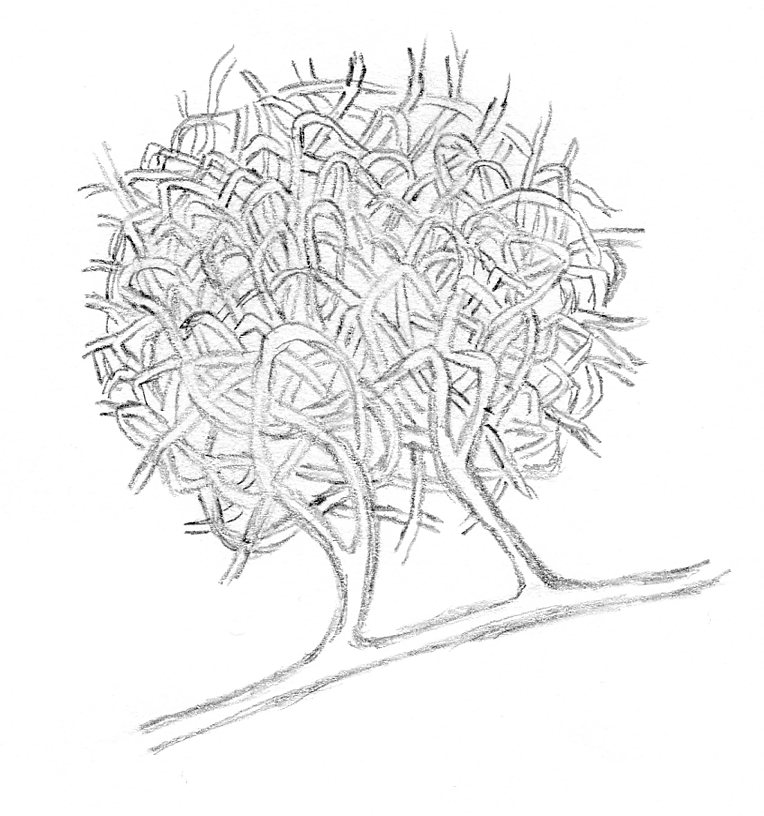
Fig 2 B Mortierella : Nested meiospore

Sexual Development

== Mortierella ==
Mortierella is the most commonly encountered and well studied of the genera. Members of this genus typically are saprobes in soil, dung, and reproductive bodies of higher fungi, but there are facultative parasites. Isolates of Mortierella can be readily obtained from forest soils on Czapek agar, hay agar, or water agar. Members of this genus are thought to play significant roles in temperate forest ecosystems, though many are psychrophiles (requiring cold temperatures for growth) and are likely overlooked in soil samples incubated at room temperature.
