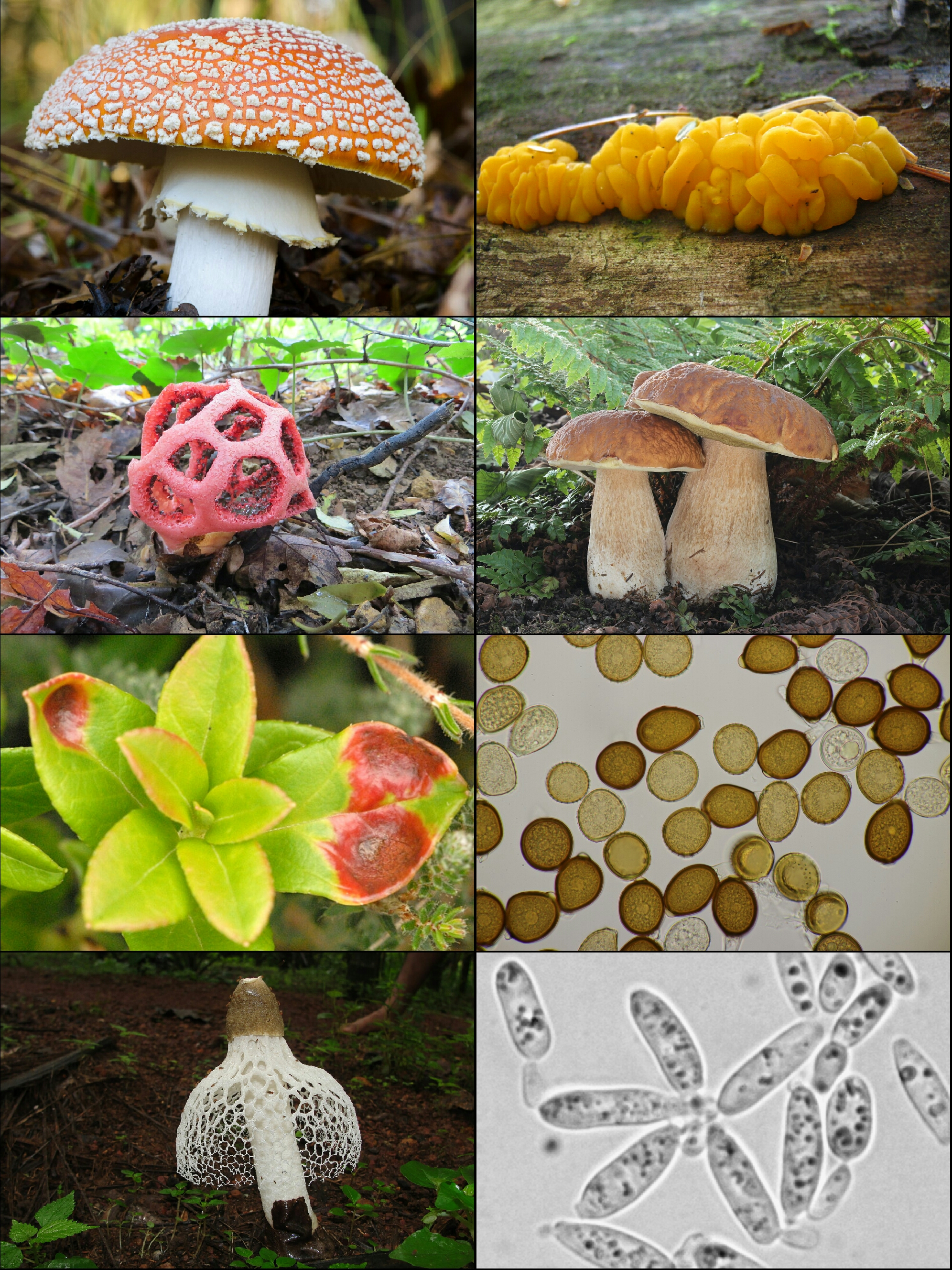
- Diversity of Basidiomycota, which includes (clockwise from top-left): fly-agaric (Amanita muscaria), Dacrymyces palmatus, porcini (Boletus edulis), Uromyces rumicis (in the Uromyces genus of rust fungi), Meredithblackwellia eburnea, bamboo mushroom (Phallus indusiatus), azalea gall (Exobasidium vaccinii), and red cage (Clathrus ruber)
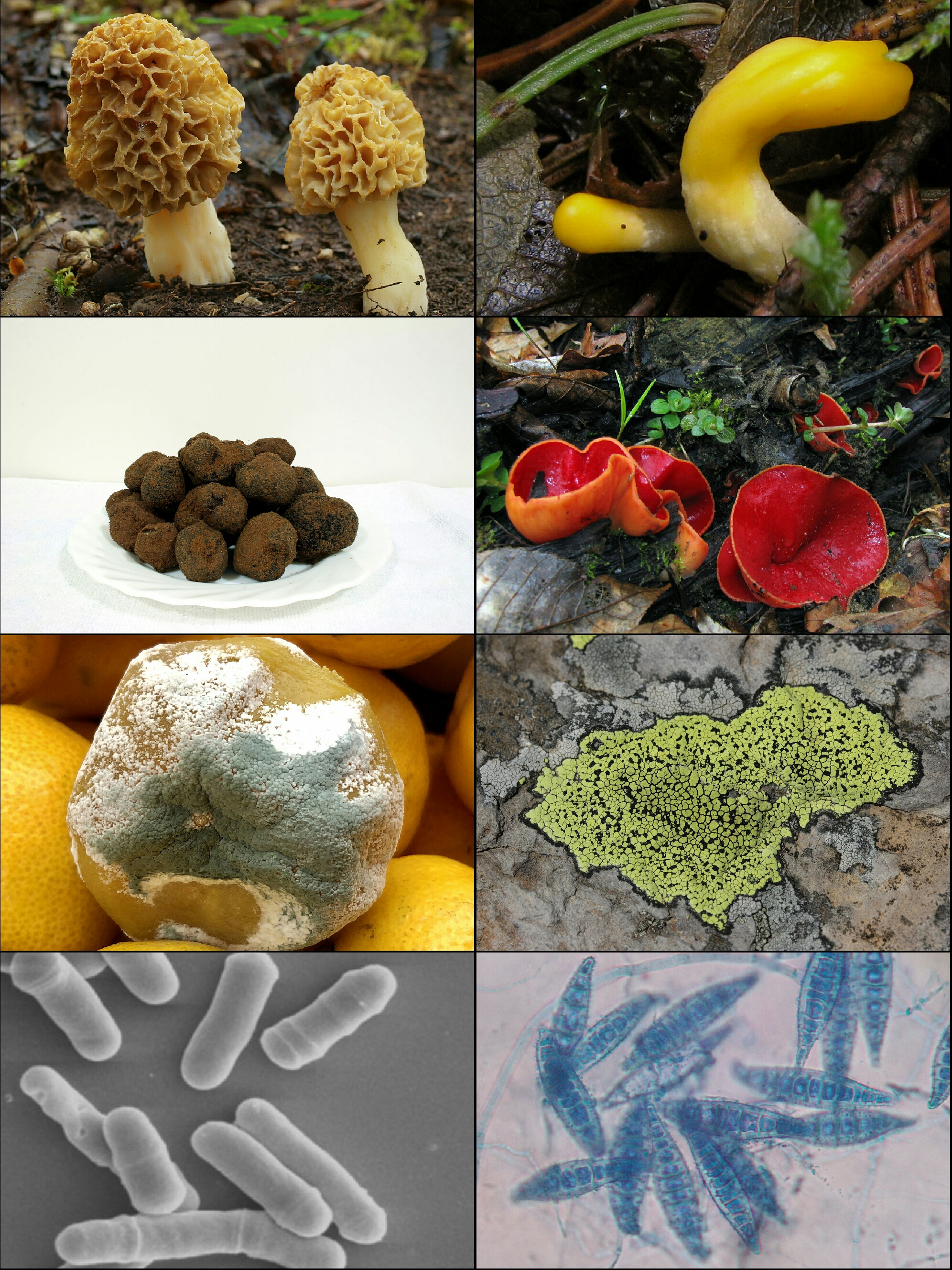
- Diversity of Ascomycota clockwise from top-left, which includes common morel (Morchella esculenta), Neolecta vitellina, scarlet elfcup (Sarcoscypha austriaca), Rhizocarpon, Microsporum canis, fission yeast (Schizosaccharomyces pombe), Penicillium, and black truffle (Tuber melanosporum)

Scientific classification
- Kingdom: Fungi
- Clade: Amastigomycota
- Subkingdom: Dikarya; Hibbett, T.Y.James & Vilgalys (2007)

Divisions
- Ascomycota; Basidiomycota; Entorrhizomycota

Synonyms
- Carpomycetaceae Bessey (1907); Neomycota Caval.-Sm. (1998) Dikaryomycota W. B. Kendr. 1985

= Dikarya =

Subkingdom of fungi

Dikarya is a subkingdom of Fungi that includes the divisions Ascomycota and Basidiomycota, both of which in general produce dikaryons, may be filamentous or unicellular, but are always without flagella. The Dikarya are most of the so-called "higher fungi", but also include many anamorphic species that would have been classified as molds in historical literature. Phylogenetically the two divisions regularly group together. In a 1998 publication, Thomas Cavalier-Smith referred to this group as the Neomycota.

== Phylogeny ==
The 2007 classification of Kingdom Fungi is the result of a large-scale collaborative research effort involving dozens of mycologists and other scientists working on fungal taxonomy. It recognizes seven divisions within the Fungi, two of which—the Ascomycota and the Basidiomycota—are contained within a branch representing subkingdom Dikarya. The cladogram depicts the major fungal taxa and their relationship to opisthokont and unikont organisms. The lengths of the branches in this tree are not proportional to evolutionary distances.

- Unikonta
  - Amoebozoa
  - Opisthokonta
    - Holozoa
      - Animalia
    - Holomycota
      - Nucleariids
      - Fungi
        - Microsporidia
        - - Chytridiomycota
          - Neocallimastigomycota
        - Blastocladiomycota
        - Zoopagomycotina
        - Kickxellomycotina
        - Entomophthoromycotina
        - Mucoromycotina
        - Glomeromycota
        - Dikarya
          - Ascomycota
          - Basidiomycota

Phylogeny of the Dikarya and upper-level taxa in Kingdom Fungi.

== Sexual reproduction ==
Dikaryons shown in a Basidiomycete mitosis cycle. Note the two nuclei coming from two separate original fungi

=== Ascomycota ===
Ascomycota life cycle and morphology

The phylum Ascomycota, or sac fungi, is characterized by formation of meiotic spores called ascospores enclosed in a special sac called an ascus. The genetic components for sexual reproduction appear to be produced by all members of this group.

=== Basidiomycota ===
Basidiomycota life cycle and morphology

The phylum Basidiomycota can be divided into three major lineages: mushrooms, rusts and smuts. Fusion of haploid nuclei (karyogamy) occurs in the basidia, club-shaped end cells. Shortly after formation of the diploid cell, meiosis occurs and the resulting four haploid nuclei migrate into four, usually external cells called basidiospores.

=== Adaptive function ===
Sexual reproduction has been proposed to have evolved in both the Ascomycota and Basidiomycota as an adaptation for repair of DNA damage via homologous recombination under stressful conditions.

== See also ==
- List of fungal orders
