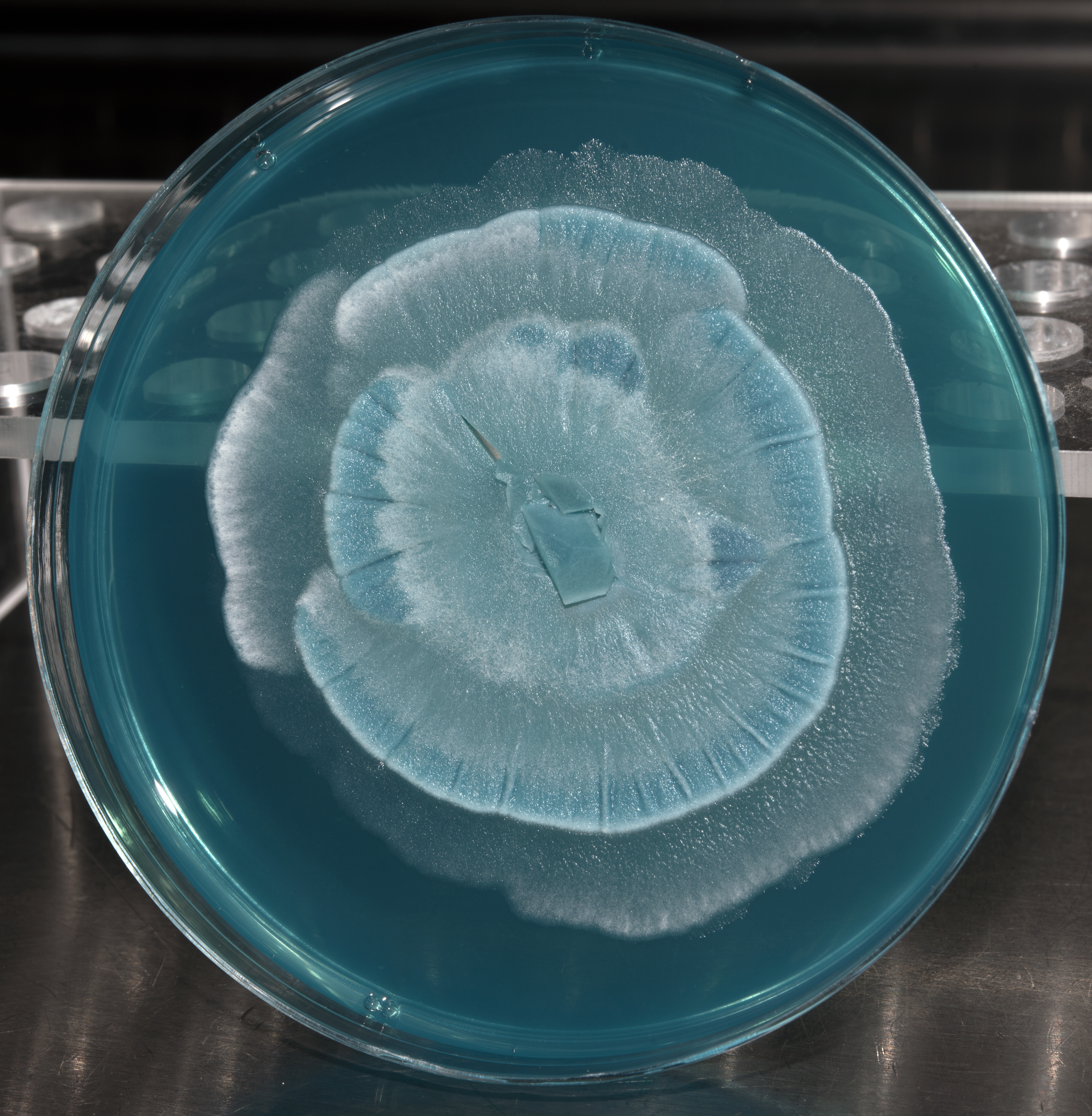

Scientific classification
- Kingdom: Fungi
- Subkingdom: Mucoromyceta
- Phylum: Mortierellomycota; Tedersoo et al. 2018
- Subphylum: Mortierellomycotina; Kerst. Hoffm., K. Voigt & P.M. Kirk 2011
- Class: Mortierellomycetes; Doweld 2014
- Order: Mortierellales; Caval.-Sm. 1998

Families
- Mortierellaceae Luerss., Handb. Syst. Bot. 1: 63. 1877

= Mortierellales =

Order of fungi

Mortierellales is a monotypic fungal order, within the phylum of Zygomycota and the monotypic, division of Mortierellomycota. It contains only 1 known family, Mortierellaceae, and 6 genera and around 129 species.

== History ==
Previously considered a family of Mucorales, it was suggested as its own order in 1998. At the time it only contained 2 genera, one of which remains. What is known is that species in this order can be parasitic or saprotrophic in nature. Cultured specimens show that they produce a fine mycelium, with branched sporangia, and produce a garlic-like odor. They are widespread, showing up in soil samples from many different locations. The most studied genera in this order is Mortierella, which contains species that cause crown rot in strawberries. There are currently 6 families and 13 described genera, with more than 100 species.

Mortierella polycephala was the first species described in 1863 by Coemans, and named after M. Du Mortier, the president of Société de Botanique de Belgique. Dissophora decumbens, the second, wasn't described until 1914, and the most recent was Lobosporangium transversal described in 2004.

== Plant-microbe interactions ==
The majority of the species in this group are saprotrophic, and thus form no known relationships with plants. They do however play a role in nutrient transfer through the breakdown of decaying organic matter. The few that are parasitic are only so for animals and not plants.

== Genera ==
- Aquamortierella - 1 sp.
- Dissophora - 3 sp.
- Gamsiella - 1 sp.
- Lobosporangium - 1 sp.
- Modicella - 3 sp.
- Mortierella - 120 sp.
