= Hartig net =

Network of inward-growing hyphae

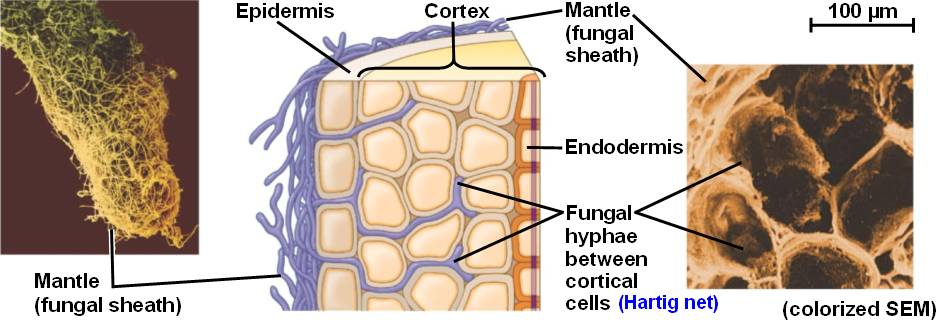
Hartig net

The Hartig net is the network of inward-growing hyphae, that extends into the plant host root, penetrating between plant cells in the root epidermis and cortex in ectomycorrhizal symbiosis. This network is the internal component of fungal morphology in ectomycorrhizal symbiotic structures formed with host plant roots, in addition to a hyphal mantle or sheath on the root surface, and extramatrical mycelium extending from the mantle into the surrounding soil. The Hartig net is the site of mutualistic resource exchange between the fungus and the host plant. Essential nutrients for plant growth are acquired from the soil by exploration and foraging of the extramatrical mycelium, then transported through the hyphal network across the mantle and into the Hartig net, where they are released by the fungi into the root apoplastic space for uptake by the plant. The hyphae in the Hartig net acquire sugars from the plant root, which are transported to the external mycelium to provide a carbon source to sustain fungal growth.

== Structure and development ==
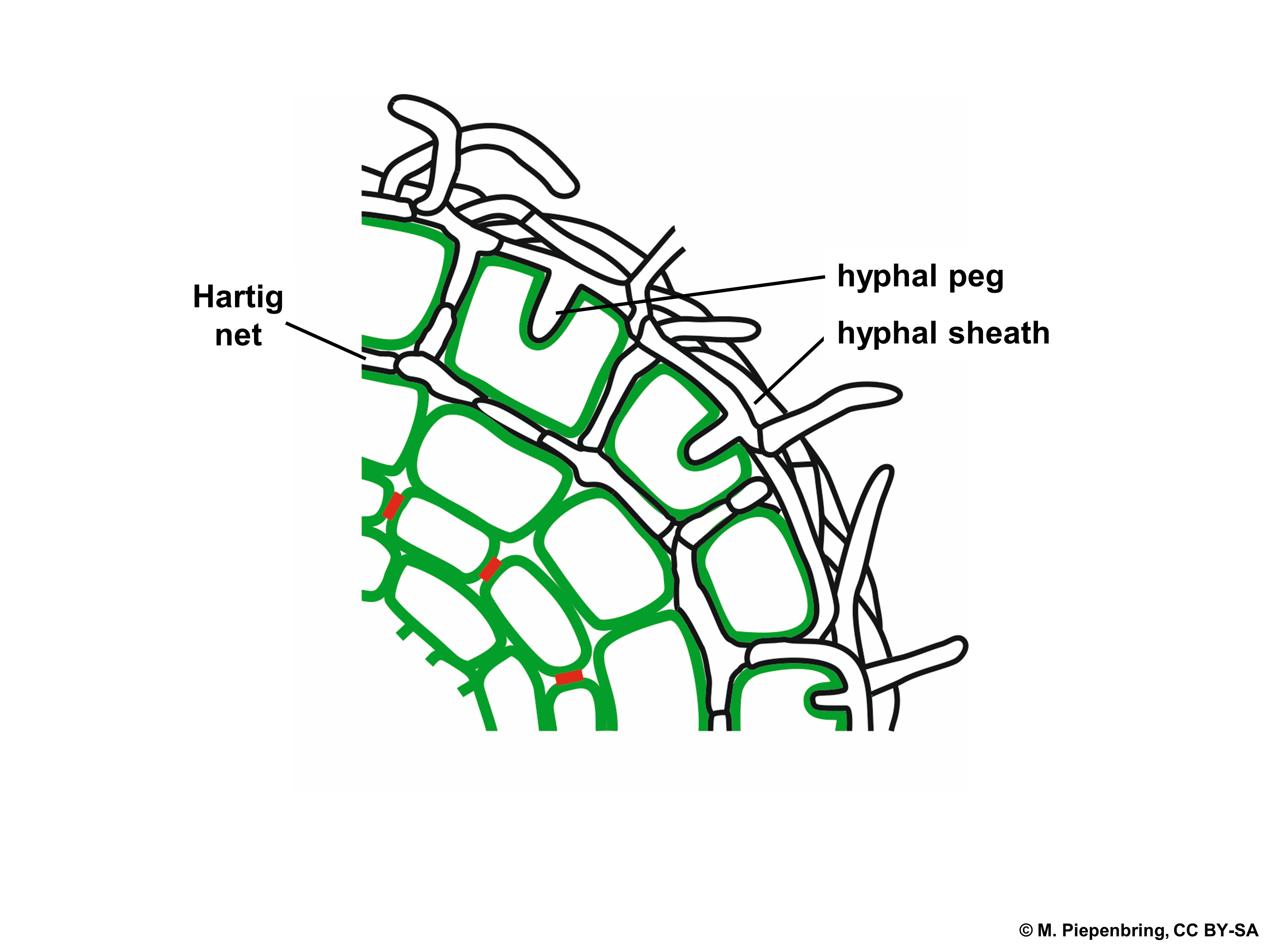
Cross-section of ectomycorrhiza showing thin mantle and Hartig net between epidermal cells

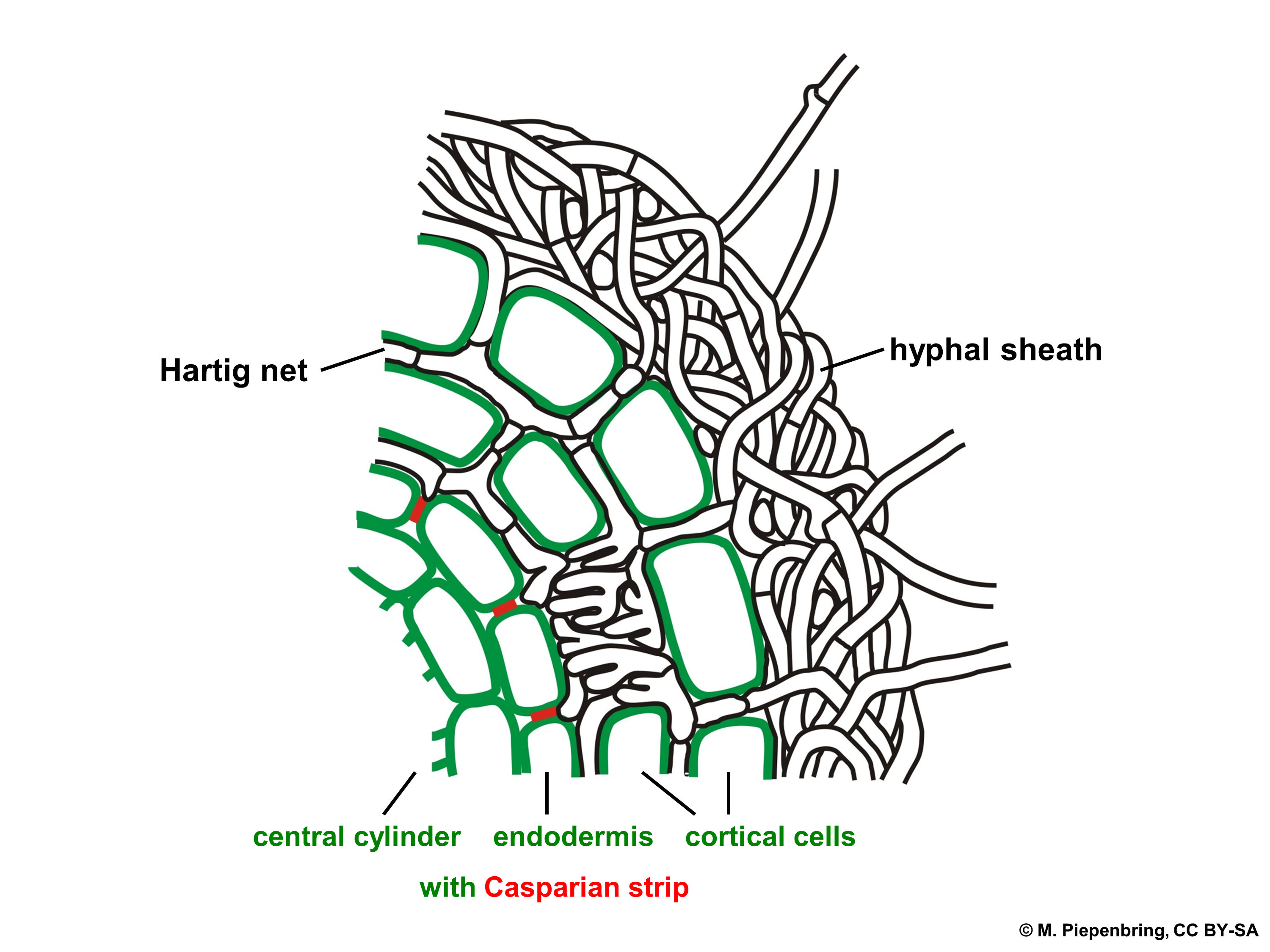
Cross-section of ectomycorrhiza showing thick mantle and Hartig net between cortical cells

The Hartig net is a lattice-like network of hyphae that grow into the plant root from the hyphal mantle at the plant root surface. The hyphae of ectomycorrhizal fungi do not penetrate the plant cells, but occupy the apoplastic space between cells in the root. This network extends between the epidermal cells near the root surface, and may also extend between cells in the root cortex. The hyphae in the Hartig net formed by some ECM fungi are described as having transfer-cell like structures, with highly folded membranes that increase surface area and facilitate secretion and uptake of resources exchanged in the mutualistic symbiosis.

The initiation of hyphal growth into the intercellular space between roots often begins between 2–4 days following the establishment of the hyphal mantle in contact with the root surface. The initial development of the Hartig net likely involves a regulated decrease of plant defense responses, thus allowing fungal infection. Studies carried out with the model ectomycorrhizal fungus Laccaria bicolor have shown that the fungus secretes a small effector protein (MISSP7) that may regulate plant defense mechanisms by controlling plant response to phytohormones. Unlike some plant root pathogenic fungi, ectomycorrhizal fungi are largely unable to produce many plant cell-wall-degrading enzymes, but increased pectin modification enzymes released by Laccaria bicolor during fungal infection and Hartig net development indicate that pectin degradation may function to loosen the adhesion between neighboring plant cells and allow room for hyphal growth between cells

This Hartig net structure is common among ectomycorrhizal fungi, although the depth and thickness of the hyphal network can vary considerably depending on the host species. Fungi associating with plants in the Pinaceae form a robust Hartig net that penetrates between cells deep into the root cortex, while the Hartig net formation in ectomycorrhizal symbioses with many angiosperms may not extend beyond the root epidermis. It has also been demonstrated that the depth and development of the Hartig net can vary among different fungi, even among isolates of the same species. Interestingly, an experiment using two isolates of Paxillus involutus, one of which only developed a loose mantle at the root surface and no developed Hartig net in poplar roots, showed that plant nitrate uptake was still improved by the symbiosis regardless of the presence of internal hyphal structure. As an additional caveat some fungal species such as Tuber melanosporum can form arbutoid mycorrhizae, involving some intracellular penetration into plant root cells by fungal hyphae in addition to developing a shallow Hartig-net-like structure between epidermal cells.

== Function ==
The Hartig net supplies the plant root with chemical elements required for plant growth, such as nitrogen and phosphorus, potassium, and micronutrients in addition to water supplied to the roots through hyphal transport. Essential nutrients acquired from surrounding soil by the extramatrical mycelium are transported into the hyphae in the Hartig net, where they are released into the apoplastic space for direct uptake directly by plant root cells.

In exchange for the nutrients provided by the fungal partner, the plant provides a portion of its photosynthetically fixed carbon to the fungal partner as sugars. Sugars are released into the apoplastic space and made available for uptake by Hartig net hyphae. Although sucrose was long considered to be an important form of carbon provided by the plant to the fungus, many ectomycorrhizal fungi lack sucrose uptake transporters. Therefore, the fungal symbiont may depend on plant production of invertases to degrade sucrose into useable monosaccharides for fungal uptake. In the Hartig net of Amanita muscaria within poplar roots, expression of important fungal enzymes for trehalose biosynthesis was higher than in the extrametrical mycelium, indicating that trehalose production may function as a carbohydrate sink, increasing fungal demand of plant photosynthesized carbon compounds through the symbiotic exchange. The plant regulatory mechanisms that influence the nutrient supply by the Hartig net are not fully understood, but it is thought that upregulation of plant defense mechanisms in response to decreased nitrogen transport by ECM fungi, rather than reductions in carbon allocation to ECM roots, suggesting that the regulation of symbiotic resource exchange for ECM symbiosis is not a simple reciprocal response.

In addition to the exchange of essential nutrients, the Hartig net may play an important role in plant strategies for tolerance of abiotic stressors, such as regulating bioaccumulation of metals or mediating plant stress responses to salinity.

== Name ==
The Hartig net is named after Theodor Hartig, a 19th-century German forest biologist and botanist. He reported research in 1842 on the anatomy of the interface between ectomycorrhizal fungi and tree roots.

== See also ==
- Mycorrhiza
