= Ectomycorrhizal extramatrical mycelium =

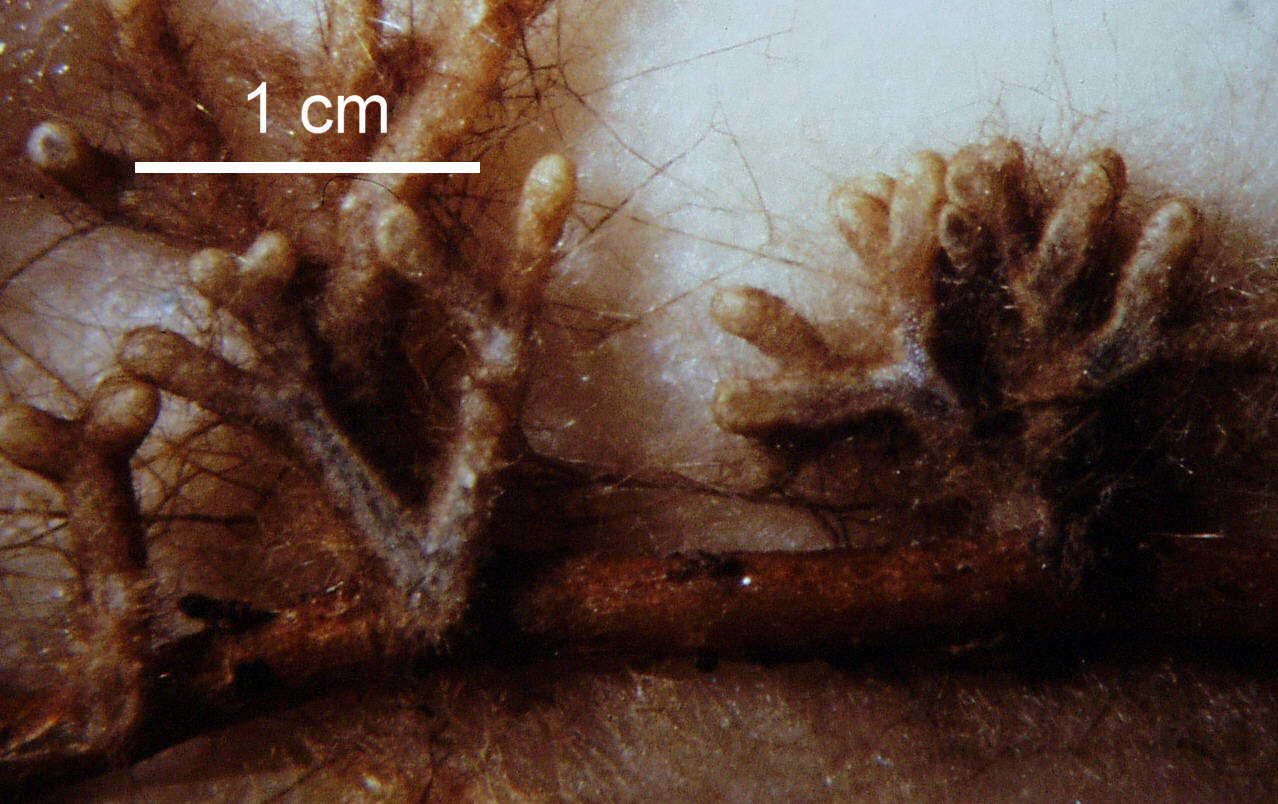
Ectomycorrhizas and short-distance extramatrical mycelium

Ectomycorrhizal extramatrical mycelium (also known as extraradical mycelium) is the collection of filamentous fungal hyphae emanating from ectomycorrhizas. It may be composed of fine, hydrophilic hypha which branches frequently to explore and exploit the soil matrix or may aggregate to form rhizomorphs; highly differentiated, hydrophobic, enduring, transport structures.

== Characteristics ==
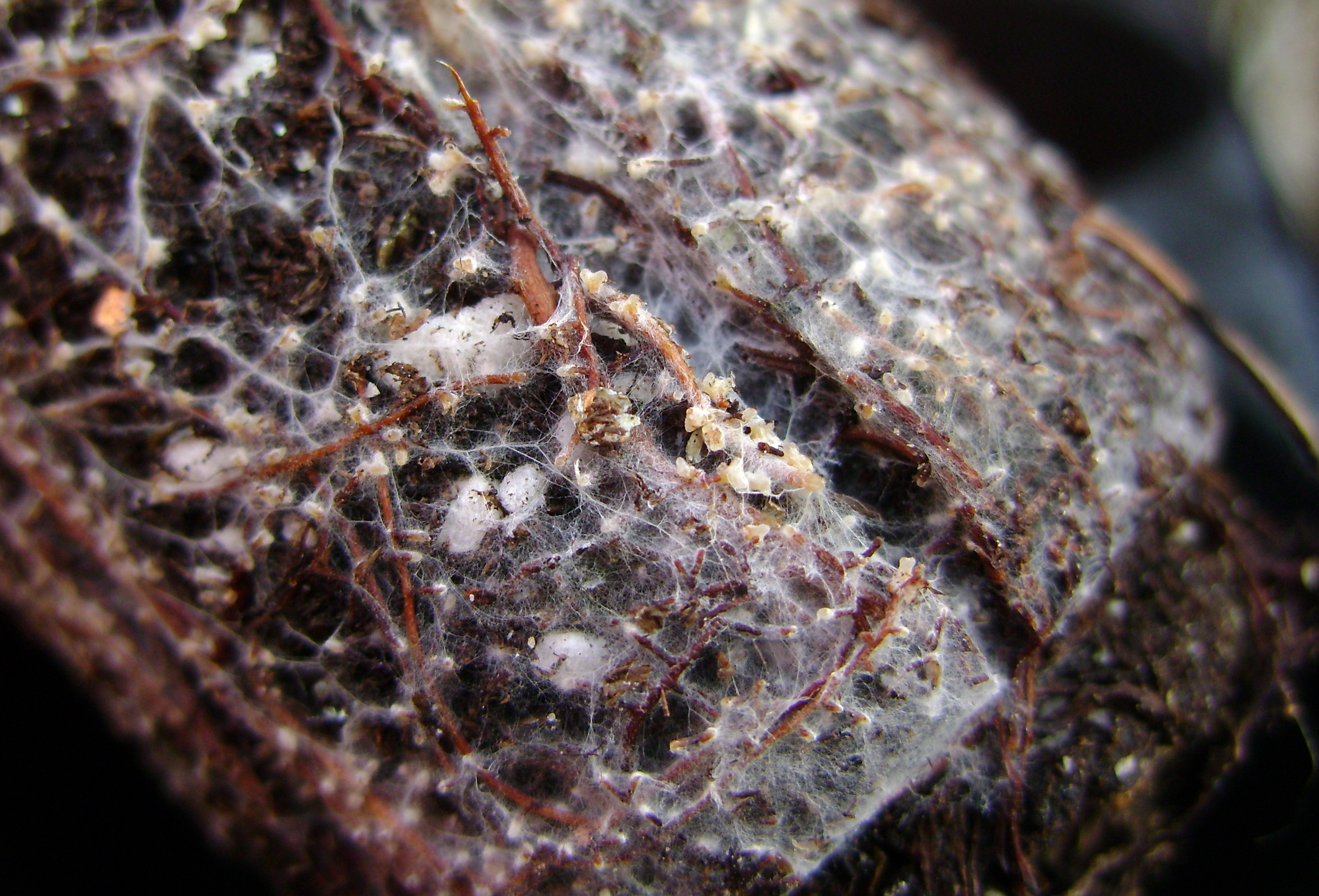
Ectomycorrhizas on Picea glauca roots surrounded by extramatrical mycelium

=== Overview ===
Apart from mycorrhizas, extramatrical mycelium is the primary vegetative body of ectomycorrhizal fungi. It is the location of mineral acquisition, enzyme production, and a key means of colonizing new root tips. Extramatrical mycelium facilitates the movement of carbon into the rhizosphere, moves carbon and nutrients between hosts and is an important food source for invertebrates.

=== Exploration type ===
The mycelial growth pattern, extent of biomass accumulation, and the presence or absence of rhizomorphs are used to classify fungi by exploration type. Agerer first proposed the designation of exploration types in 2001, and the concept has since been widely employed in studies of ectomycorrhizal ecology. Four exploration types are commonly recognized: Contact, Short-distance, Medium-distance and Long-distance.

Contact exploration types possess a predominantly smooth mantle and lack rhizomorphs with ectomycorrhizas in close contact with the surrounding substrate. Short-distance exploration types also lack rhizomorphs but the mantle is surrounded by frequent projections of hyphae, which emanate a short distance into the surrounding substrate. Most ectomycorrhizal ascomycetes are included in this group.

Medium-distance exploration types are further divided into three subtypes defined by the growth range and differentiation of its rhizomorphs. Medium-distance Fringe form interconnected hyphal networks with rhizomorphs that divide and fuse repeatedly. Medium-distance Mat types form dense hyphal mats which aggregate into a homogeneous mass. Finally, the Medium-distance Smooth sub-type has rhizomorphs with smooth mantles and margins.

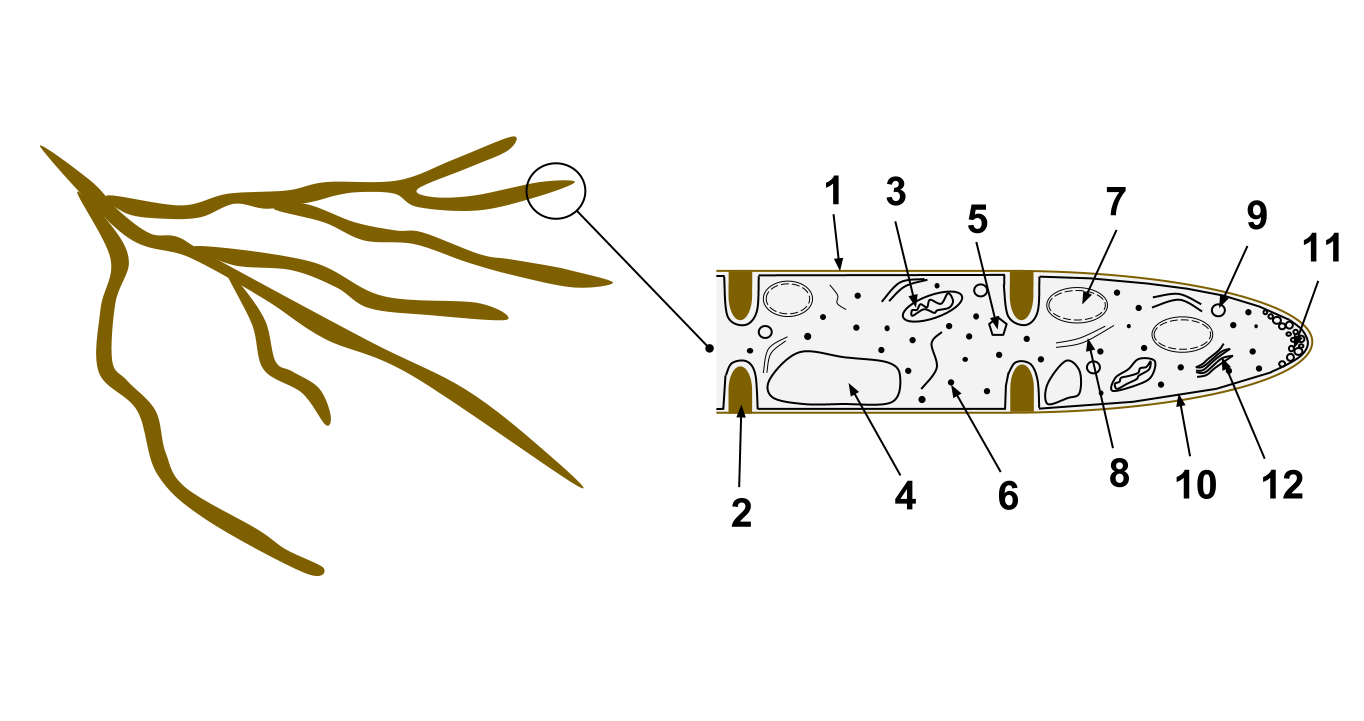
Fungal Hyphae Cells 1- Hyphal wall 2- Septum 3- Mitochondrion 4- Vacuole 5- Ergosterol crystal 6- Ribosome 7- Nucleus 8- Endoplasmic reticulum 9- Lipid body 10- Plasma membrane 11- Spitzenkörper/growth tip and vesicles 12- Golgi apparatus

Long-distance exploration types are highly differentiated, forming rhizomorphs that contain hollow vessel-like transport tubes. Long distance types are associated with increased levels of organic nitrogen uptake compared to other exploration types and are thought to be less competitive in disturbed systems in contrast to short distance types which are able to regenerate more efficiently after a disturbance event.

Exploration type is primarily consistent within a given lineage. However, some fungal genera which contain a large number of species have a great diversity of extramatrical hyphal morphology and are known to contain more than one exploration type. Because of this, extrapolating exploration type to species known only by lineage is difficult. Often, fungi fail to fit into a defined exploration type, falling instead along a gradient. Exploration type also fails to take into account other aspects of hyphal morphology, such as the extent to which hyphae cross into deeper soil horizons.

Field studies have shown that extramatrical mycelium is more likely to proliferate in mineral soils than in organic material, and may be particularly absent in fresh leaf litter. However, the presence of different ectomycorrhizal groups in different soil horizons suggest that different groups have evolved specialized niche separation, possibly attributable to exploration type.

== Ecological implications ==
=== Community assembly ===
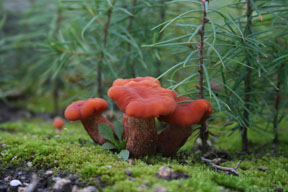
Ectomycorrhizal Laccaria fruit bodies in forest community

Because ectomycorrhizas are small and possess a limited contact area with the surrounding soil, the presence of extramatrical hyphae significantly increases the surface area in contact with the surrounding environment. Increased surface area means greater access to necessary nutrient sources. Additionally, the presence of rhizomorphs or mycelial cords, can act comparably to xylem tissue in plants, where hollow tubes of vessel hyphae shuttle water and solubilized nutrients over long distances. The abundance and spatial distribution of host root tips in the rhizosphere is an important factor mediating ectomycorrhizal community assembly. Root density may select for the exploration types best suited for a given root spacing. In pine systems, fungi that display short-distance exploration types are less able to colonize new roots spaced far from the mycorrhiza, and long-distance types dominate areas of low root density. Conversely, short-distance exploration types tend to dominate areas of high root density where decreased carbon expenditure makes them more competitive than long-distance species. The growth of extramatrical mycelium has a direct effect on the mutualistic nutrient trading between ectomycorrhizal fungi and their hosts. Increased hyphal occupation of the soil allows the fungus to take greater advantage of water and nutrients otherwise inaccessible to plant roots and to more efficiently transport these resources back to the plant. Conversely, the increased costs in carbon allocation associated with supporting a fungal partner with an extensive mycelial system presents a number of questions related to the costs and benefits of ectomycorrhizal mutualism.

=== Carbon cycling ===
Although there is evidence that certain species of mycorrhizal fungi may obtain at least a portion of their carbon via saprotrophic nutrition, the bulk of mycorrhizal carbon acquisition happens by way of trading for host-derived photosynthetic products. Mycorrhizal systems represent a major carbon sink. Laboratory studies predict that around 23% of plant-derived carbon is allocated to extrametrical mycelium, although an estimated 15-30% of this is lost to fungal respiration. Carbon allocation is distributed unequally to extramatrical mycelium depending on fungal taxa, nutrient availability, and the age of the associated mycorrhizas. Much of the carbon allocated to extramatrical mycelium accumulates as fungal biomass, making up an estimated one-third of the total microbial biomass and one-half of the total dissolved organic carbon in some forest soils. Carbon also supports the production of sporocarps and sclerotia, with various taxa investing differentially in these structures rather than in the proliferation of extramatrical mycelium. Carbon acquisition also goes toward the production of fungal exudates. Extramatrical hyphae excrete a range of compounds into the soil matrix, accounting for as much as 40% of total carbon usage. These exudates are released primarily at the growing front, and are used in functions such as mineralization and homeostasis.

Many researchers have attempted projections of the role that extramatrical mycelium may play in carbon sequestration. Although estimates of the life span of individual ectomycorrhizas very considerably, turnover is generally considered on a scale of months.

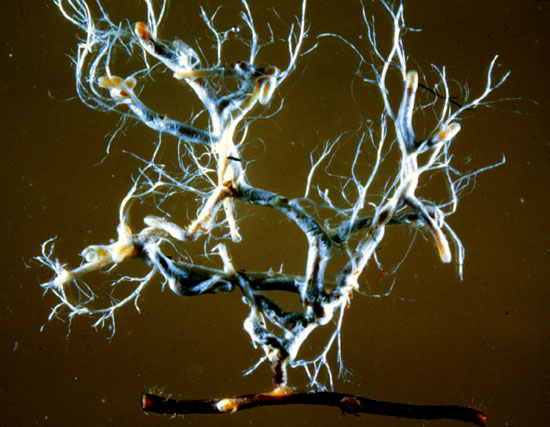
Cortinarius ectomycorrhizas and extramatrical mycelium on Pseudotsuga menziesii roots

After death, the presence ectomycorrhizas on root tips, may increase the rate of root decomposition for some fungal taxa. Besides host plant death and mycorrhizal turnover, rates of carbon sequestration may also be affected by disturbances in the soil, which cause sections of the extramatrical mycelium to become severed from the host plant. Such disturbances, such as those caused by animal disruption, mycophagous invertebrates or habitat destruction, may have a notable impact on turnover rates. These variables make it difficult to estimate the turnover rates of mycorrhizal biomass in forest soils and the relative contribution of extramatrical mycelium to carbon sequestration.

=== Mycelial networks ===
The presence of long-distance extramatrical hyphae may affect forest health via the formation of common mycelial networks, in which hyphal connections form between plant hosts, located between the root cells of the host, can facilitate the transfer of carbon and nutrients between hosts. While common mycelial networks (CMNs) allow for interplant carbon exchange primarily between photosynthetic plants, a number of non-photosynthetic plants have also adapted to participate in carbon transfer via CMNs. The extensive reach of the network beyond the roots of a plant enables the fungal hyphae to provide mineral nutrients to its host plant in exchange for carbon.

Beyond facilitating nutrient transfer, CMNs have several other functions including compound signaling and plant-plant communication. CMNs transfer warning signs of pathogen attacks between plants and allow newly developed roots to quickly become colonized by a fully functioning fungal mycelium. CMNs connect many plants and stress-induced signals are transferred from the stress-inflicted plant to others, activating defense-related responses. These warning signals originate from the plant itself and proceed to the roots of the plant. From the roots, the signals enter the mycorrhizal fungi and travel through the network to relay warnings to other plants connected to the network. Mycelial networks may also be responsible for facilitating the transport of allelopathic chemicals from the supplying plant directly to the rhizosphere of other plants. Ectomycorrhizal fungi increase primary production in host plants, with multi trophic effects. In this way, extramatrical mycelium is important to the maintenance of soil food webs, supplying a significant nutritive source to invertebrates and microorganisms as well as overall plant competition and diversity.

While CMNs enable mutually beneficial connections between plants via nutrient transfer and defense warnings, these networks can also lead to unequal relationships between plants in which one benefits at the expense of the other. In a CMN shared between two plants, it is possible that one plant receives more nutrients from the network or supplies an unequal amount of carbon to mutual fungal hyphae, resulting in that plant species exploiting the network and gaining more than the other. Consequently, the other plant will be worse off due to the CMN connecting it to the exploitative plant.

There are two types of mycorrhizal networks. Most plants are associated with arbuscular mycorrhizal fungi (AMF). AMF are able to form symbioses with several plant species and connect to roots of different hosts, allowing CMN. Mycelium networks function through signals that are first produced in plants, then move to the roots and then migrate to AMF. Then, signals go through the plant surface where they can be transported to leaves or other organs. Cells respond to these signals by forming a tube-like structure in preparation for the fungal hyphae. Mycelia of AMF can link many plants across large areas.

The second type is ectomycorrhizal networks (ECMs). ECM fungi are extremely diverse, resulting in varied behaviors towards their plant hosts. Compared to AMFs, ECM are more diverse and form mainly in trees. ECMs mediate plant and tree nutrients by interrupting the sylvigenetic cycle during maturity. Because ECMs vary by tree, tree cutting and logging has shown a reduction in the ECM fungal community. Thus, creating imitations of ECMs in artificial ecosystems could be a solution for designing urban green spaces.

== Mineral access ==
=== Enzyme production ===
The enzymatic activities of ectomycorrhizal fungi are highly variable between species. These differences are correlated with exploration type (particularly the presence or absence of rhizomorphs) rather than lineage or host association- suggesting that similar morphologies of extraradical mycelium are an example of convergent evolution. Differences in enzymatic activity, and hence the ability to degrade organic compounds dictate fungal nutrient access, with wide-ranging ecological implications.

=== Phosphorus ===
Because diverse ectomycorrhizal fungal taxa differ greatly in their metabolic activity they also often differ in their capacity to trade nutrients with their hosts. Phosphorus acquisition by mycorrhizal fungi, and the subsequent transfer to plant hosts, is thought to be one of the main functions of ectomycorrhizal symbiosis. Extramatrical mycelium is the site of collection for phosphorus within the soil system. This relationship is so strong that starving host plants of phosphorus is known to increase the growth of extramatrical mycelium tenfold.

=== Nitrogen ===
Recently, Isotopic studies have been used to investigate relative trading between ectomycorrhizal fungi and plant hosts and to assess the relative importance of exploration type on nutrient trading ability. ^{15}N values are elevated in ectomycorrhizal Fungi and depleted in fungal hosts, as a result of nutrient trading. Fungal species with exploration types producing greater amounts of extraradical mycelium are known to accumulate greater amounts ^{15}N in both root tips and fruit bodies, a phenomenon partially attributed to higher levels of N cycling within these species.

== Assessment methods ==
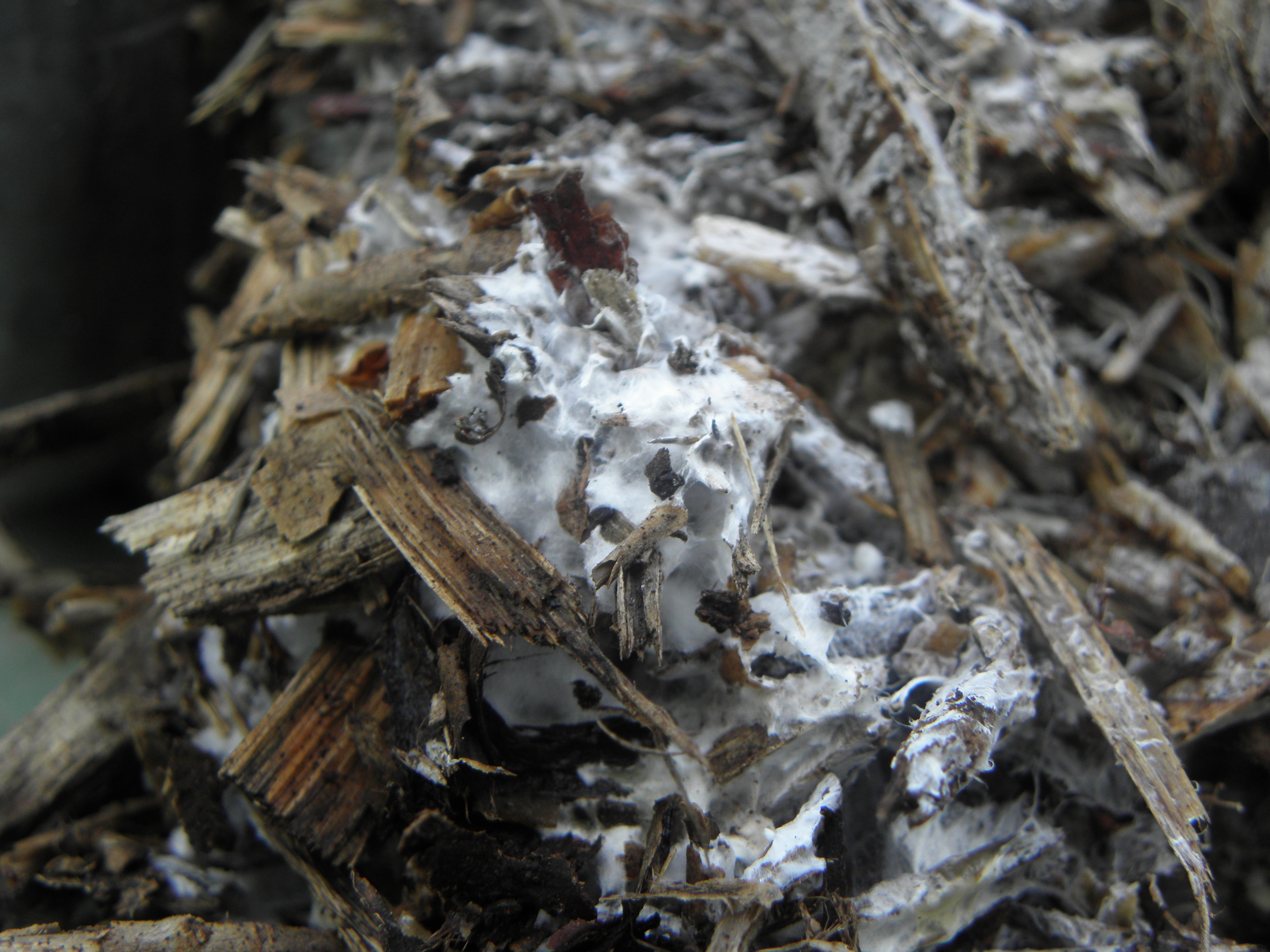
Amanita phalloides mycelium

Determining the longevity of extramatrical mycelium is difficult, and estimates range from just a few months to several years. Turnover rates are assessed in a variety of ways including direct observation and ^{14}C dating. Such estimates are an important variable in calculating the contribution that ectomycorrhizal fungi have to carbon sequestration. In order to differentiate ectomycorrhizal mycelium from the mycelium of saprotrophic fungi, biomass estimates are often done by ergosterol or phospholipid fatty acid analysis, or by using sand-filled bags, which are likely to be avoided by saprotrophic fungi because they lack organic matter. Detailed morphological characterization of exploration type has been defined for over 550 different ectomycorrhizal species and are compiled in Deemy Database. Due to the difficulty in classifying exploration types of intermediate forms, other metrics have been proposed to qualify and quantify the growth of extramatrical mycelium, including Specific Actual/Potential Mycelium Space Occupation and Specific Extramatrical Mycelial Length which attempt to account for the contributions of mycelial density, surface area and total biomass.
