= Ectomycorrhiza =

Non-penetrative symbiotic association between a fungus and the roots of a vascular plant

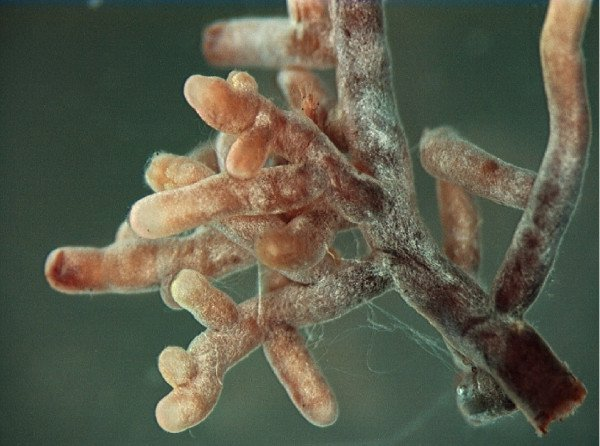
Ectomycorrhizal symbiosis, showing root tips with fungal mycelium from the genus Amanita

An ectomycorrhiza (from Ancient Greek ἐκτός (ektós) 'outside', μύκης (múkēs) 'fungus' and ῥίζα (rhíza) 'root'; abbreviated EcM; pl. ectomycorrhizae or ectomycorrhizas) is a form of symbiotic relationship that occurs between a fungal symbiont, or mycobiont, and the roots of various plant species. The mycobiont is often from the division Basidiomycota and Ascomycota, and more rarely from the Zygomycota.

Ectomycorrhizae form on the roots of around 2% of plant species, usually woody plants, including species from the birch, dipterocarp, myrtle, beech, willow, pine and rose families. Research on ectomycorrhizae is increasingly important in areas such as ecosystem management and restoration, forestry, and agriculture.

Unlike other mycorrhizal relationships, such as arbuscular mycorrhiza and ericoid mycorrhiza, ectomycorrhizal fungi do not penetrate their host's cell wall. Instead they form an entirely intercellular interfaces known as the Hartig net, consisting of highly branched hyphae forming a latticework between epidermal and cortical root cells.

Ectomycorrhizas are further differentiated from other mycorrhizas by the formation of a dense hyphal sheath, known as the mantle, surrounding the root surface. This sheathing mantle can be up to 40 μm thick, with hyphae extending up to several centimeters into the surrounding soil. The hyphal network helps the plant to take up nutrients including water and minerals, often helping the host plant to survive adverse conditions. In exchange, the fungal symbiont is provided with access to carbohydrates.

Although samples of ectomycorrhizas are usually taken from the surface horizon due to higher root density, ectomycorrhizas are known to occur in deep tree roots (a depth more than 2 meters), some occurring at least as deep as 4 m.

EcM fungal fruiting bodies can be either edible, such as the highly sought-after truffle (Tuber), or deadly, such as death caps and destroying angels (Amanita).

== Evolution ==
Mycorrhizal symbioses are ubiquitous in terrestrial ecosystems, and it is possible that these associations helped to facilitate land colonization by plants. There is paleobiological and molecular evidence that arbuscular mycorrhizas (AM) originated at least 460 million years ago.

EcM plants and fungi exhibit a wide taxonomic distribution across all continents (apart from Antarctica), suggesting that the EcM symbiosis has ancient evolutionary roots. Pinaceae is the oldest extant plant family in which symbiosis with EcM fungi occurs, and fossils from this family date back to at least the Late Jurrassic. Among the oldest true fossils of ectomycorrhizae-pine roots comes from Pinus arnoldii, a Early Eocene fossil found in the Eocene Okanagan Highlands cherts at Princeton, British Columbia.

It has been proposed that habitat type and the distinct functions of different mycorrhizas help determine which type of symbiosis is predominant in a given area. In this theory, EcM symbioses evolved in ecosystems such as boreal forests that are relatively productive but in which nutrient cycling is still limiting. Ectomycorrhizas are intermediate in their ability to take up nutrients, being more efficient than arbuscular mycorrhizas and less so than ericoid mycorrhizas, making them useful in an intermediate nutrient situation.

=== Paleobiology ===
Fungi are composed of soft tissues, making fossilization difficult and the discovery of fungal fossils rare. However, some preserved specimens have been described in the Ypresian age Princeton Chert of British Columbia. These ectomycorrhizal fossils show clear evidence of a Hartig net, mantle and hyphae, demonstrating well-established EcM associations at least 50 million years ago.

The fossil record shows that the more common arbuscular mycorrhizas formed long before other types of fungal-plant symbioses. Ectomycorrhizas may have evolved with the diversification of plants and the evolution of conifers and angiosperms. Arbuscular mycorrhizas may thus have been a driving force in the plant colonization of land, while ectomycorrhizas may have arisen either in response to further speciation as the Earth's climate became more seasonal and arid, or perhaps simply in response to nutritionally deficient habitats.

=== Molecular studies ===
Molecular and phylogenetic analyses of fungal lineages suggest that EcM fungi have evolved and persisted numerous times from non-EcM ancestors such as humus and wood saprotrophic fungi. The estimates range from 7–16 to ~66 independent evolutions of EcM associations. Some studies suggest that reversals back to the ancestral free-living condition have occurred, but this is controversial.

== Morphology ==
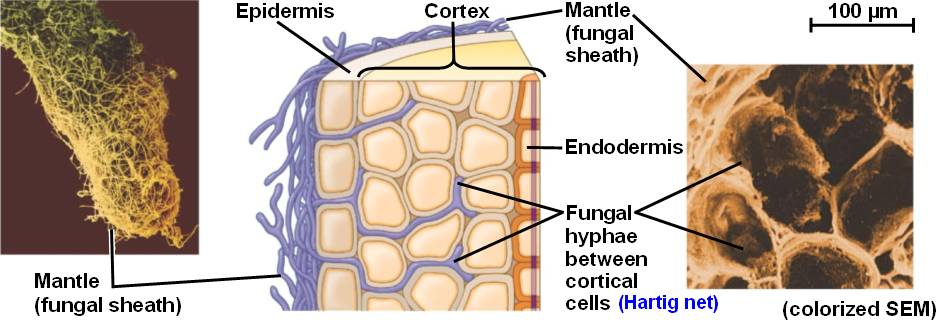
Basic morphology of a common ectomycorrhizal association

As suggested by the name, the biomass of the mycosymbiont is mostly exterior to the plant root. The fungal structure is composed primarily of three parts: 1) the intraradical hyphae making up the Hartig net; 2) the mantle that forms a sheath surrounding the root tip; and 3) the extraradical hyphae and related structures that spread throughout the soil.

=== Hartig net ===
The Hartig net is formed by an ingrowth of hyphae (often originating from the inner part of the surrounding mantle) into the root of the plant host. The hyphae penetrate and grow in a transverse direction to the axis of the root, and thus form a network between the outer cells of the root axis. In this region fungal and root cells touch, and this is where nutrient and carbon exchange occurs.

The depth of penetration differs between species. In Eucalyptus and Alnus the Hartig net is confined to the epidermis, whereas in most gymnosperms the hyphae penetrate more deeply, into the cortical cells or the endodermis. In many epidermal types elongation of cells along the epidermis occurs, increasing surface contact between fungus and root cells. Most cortical type Hartig nets do not show this elongation, suggesting different strategies for increasing surface contact among species.

=== Mantle ===
A hyphal sheath known as the mantle, which often has more biomass than the Hartig net interface, envelops the root. The structure of the mantle is variable, ranging from a loose network of hyphae to a structured and stratified arrangement of tissue. Often, these layers resemble plant parenchyma tissue and are referred to as pseudoparenchymatous.

Because the root is enveloped by the mantle it is often affected developmentally. EcM fungal partners characteristically suppress root hair development of their plant symbiont. They can also increase root branching by inducing cytokinins in the plant. These branching patterns can become so extensive that a single consolidated mantle can envelop many root tips at a time. Structures like this are called tuberculate or coralloid ectomycorrhizas.

The mantles of different EcM pairs often display characteristic traits such as color, extent of branching, and degree of complexity which are used to help identify the fungus, often in tandem with molecular analyses. Fruiting bodies are also useful but are not always available.

=== Extraradical hyphae and linkage ===
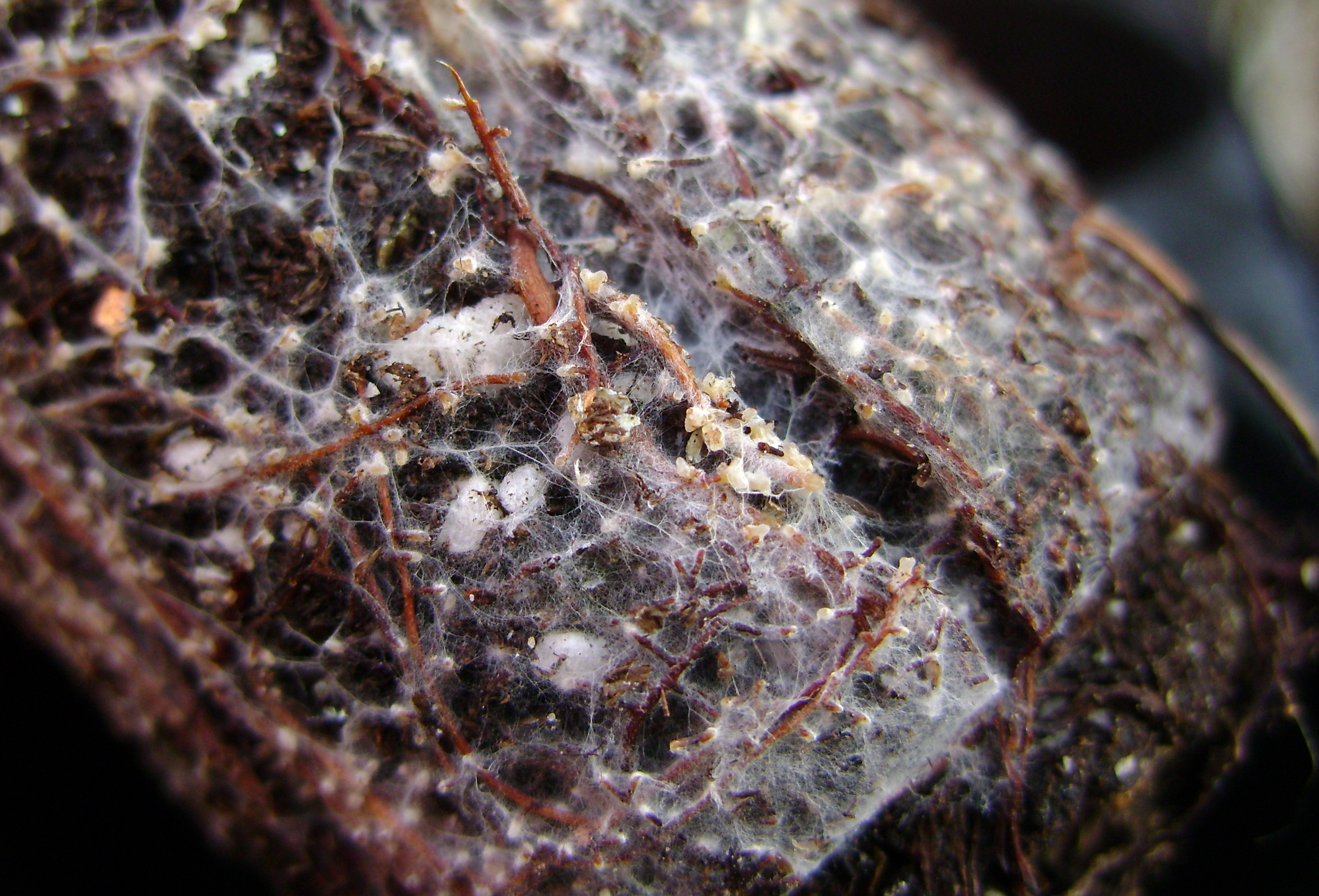
Extraradical mycelia (white) on the roots of Picea glauca (brown)

Extraradical hyphae extend outward from the mantle into the soil, compensating for the suppression of root hairs by increasing the effective surface area of the colonized root. These hyphae can spread out singly, or in an aggregate arrangement known as a rhizomorph. These composite hyphal organs can have a wide range of structures. Some rhizomorphs are simply parallel, linear collections of hyphae. Others have more complex organization, for example the central hyphae may be larger in diameter than other hyphae, or the hyphae may grow continuously at the tip, penetrating into new areas in a way that superficially resembles meristematic activity.

This part of the ectomycorrhiza, which is called the extraradical or extramatrical mycelium, functions largely as a transport structure. They often spread considerable distances, maintaining a large contact area with the soil. Some studies have shown a relationship between nutrient transport rates and the degree of rhizomorph organization. The rhizomorphs of different EcM types often have different organization types and exploration strategies, observed as different structure and growth within the soil. These differences also help identify the symbiotic fungus.

The hyphae extending outward into the soil from an ectomycorrhiza can infect other nearby plants. Experiments and field studies show that this can lead to the formation of common mycorrhizal networks (CMNs) that allow sharing of carbon and nutrients among the connected host plants. For example, the rare isotope carbon-14 was added to a particular tree and later detected in nearby plants and seedlings. One study observed a bidirectional carbon transfer between Betula papyrifera and Pseudotsuga menziesii, primarily through the hyphae of the ectomycorrhiza. However, not all plants are compatible with all fungal networks, so not all plants can exploit the benefits of established ectomycorrhizal linkages.

The shared nutrient connection through CMNs has been suggested to be involved with other ecological processes such as seedling establishment, forest succession and other plant-plant interactions. Some arbuscular mycorrhizas have been shown to carry signals warning plants on the network of attack by insects or disease.

=== Fruiting bodies ===
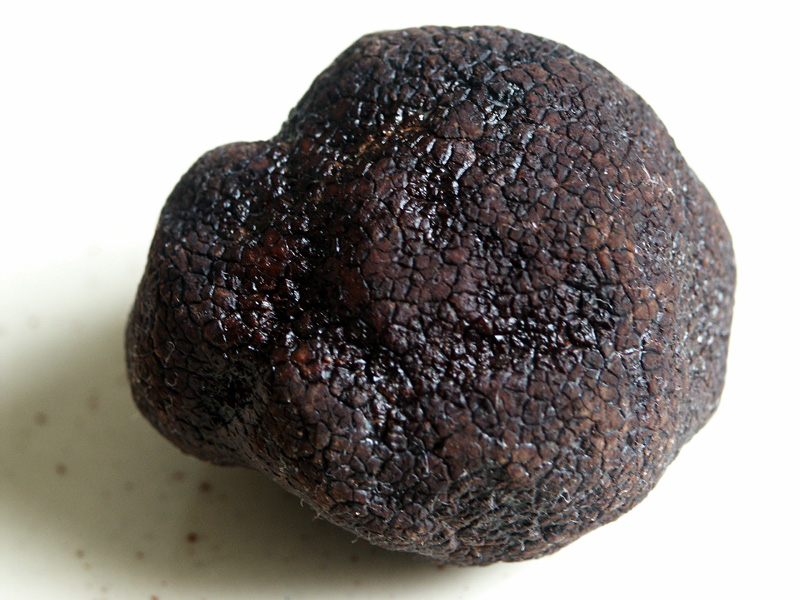
The hypogeous sporocarp of Tuber melanosporum, the black Périgord truffle

Unlike most arbuscular mycorrhizal fungi, EcM fungi reproduce sexually and produce visible fruiting bodies in a wide variety of forms. The fruiting body, or sporocarp, can be thought of as an extension of the extraradical hyphae. Its cell walls and spores are typically composed of complex carbohydrates, and often incorporate a great deal of nitrogen. Many EcM fungi can only form fruiting bodies and complete their life cycles by participating in an EcM relationship.

The fruit bodies of many species take on classic, well-recognized shapes such as epigeous mushrooms and hypogeous truffles. Most of these produce microscopic propagules of about 10 μm that can disperse over large distances by way of various vectors, ranging from wind to mycophagous animals. It has been suggested that animals are drawn to hypogeous fruiting bodies because they are rich in nutrients such as nitrogen, phosphorus, minerals and vitamins. However, others argue that the specific nutrients are less important than the availability of food at specific times of the year.

Surveys of fruiting bodies have been used to assess community composition and richness in many studies. However, this method is imperfect as fruiting bodies do not last long and can be hard to detect.

== Physiology ==
=== Presymbiosis ===
To form an ectomycorrhizal connection, the fungal hyphae must first grow towards the plant's roots. Then they must envelope and penetrate the root cap cells and infect them, allowing the symbiotic Hartig net and associated structures to form. Both partners (plant and fungus) must follow a precise sequence of gene expression for this to be successful. There is evidence that communication between the partners in the early stage of ectomycorrhiza occurs in some cases via volatile organic compounds produced only during the interaction phase, and that genes involved in secretory, apical growth, and infection processes show changes in expression early in the pre-contact phase. Thus, a complex set of molecular changes appears to take place even before the fungus and host plant make contact.

The plant hosts release metabolites into the rhizosphere that can trigger basidiospore germination, growth of hyphae towards the root, and the early steps of EcM formation. These include flavonoids, diterpenes, cytokinins, hormones and other nutrients. Some host-released metabolites have been shown to stimulate fungal growth in Pisolithus, modify the branching angle of hyphae, and cause other changes in the fungus. Some fungal genes appear to be expressed before plant contact, suggesting that signals in the soil may induce important fungal genes at a distance from the plant.

=== Symbiosis ===
Once the fungal hyphae make contact with root cap cells, they must continue to grow inwards to the epidermal cells and multiply to form the layers that will eventually produce the mantle. Production of the fungal mantle involves the upregulation of genes responsible for translation and cell growth, as well as those responsible for membrane synthesis and function, such as hydrophobins. Some polypeptides are only found when the fungus and plant have achieved symbiosis; these symbiosis-related (SR) proteins are termed ectomycorrhizins.

Major changes in polypeptide and mRNA synthesis happen rapidly after colonization by the fungus, including the production of ectomycorrhizins. Changes include the upregulation of genes that may help new membranes to form at the symbiotic interface. The effect of the mantle on root proliferation, root hair development and dichotomous branching can be partially mimicked by fungal exudates, providing a path to identifying the molecules responsible for communication.

The Hartig net initially forms from the fully differentiated inner layer of the mantle, and penetration occurs in a broad front oriented at right angles to the root axis, digesting through the apoplastic space. Some plant cells respond by producing stress- and defense-related proteins including chitinases and peroxidases that could inhibit Hartig net formation. However, extensive root colonization still occurs in these plants and these hallmarks of resistance seem to diminish by about day 21 after colonization, implying that EcM fungi can suppress the defense response.

As the fungus and plant become closely connected, they begin to share nutrients. This process is also controlled by symbiosis-related genes. For example, monosaccharide uptake in Amanita muscaria requires a transporter that is only expressed when it is in a mycorrhizal association. When the transporter is expressed, leading to increased import of sugar by the fungus, the plant host responds by increasing sugar availability. The transport of ammonium and amino acids from fungus to plant is also regulated.

=== Nutrient uptake and exchange ===
Nitrogen is essential in plant biochemistry, being required for chlorophyll and all proteins. In most terrestrial ecosystems nitrogen is in short supply and is sequestered in organic matter that is hard to break down. Fungal symbionts thus offer two advantages to plants: the greater range of their hyphae when compared with roots, and a greater ability to extract nitrogen from the layer of soil in which organic matter lies. Net transfer of nutrients to plants requires the nutrient to cross three interfaces: 1) the soil-fungus interface, 2) the fungus-apoplast interface, and 3) the apoplast-root cell interface. It has been estimated that ectomycorrhizal fungi receive approximately 15% of the host plant's food product and in return provide up to 86% of a host's nitrogen needs.

Some studies have shown that if there is too much nitrogen available due to human use of fertilizer, plants can shift their resources away from the fungal network. This can pose problems for the fungus, which may be unable to produce fruiting bodies, and over the long term can cause changes in the types of fungal species present in the soil. In one study species richness declined dramatically with increasing nitrogen inputs, with over 30 species represented at low nitrogen sites and only 9 at high nitrogen sites.

As the hyphae of the Hartig net region become more densely packed, they press against the cell walls of the plant's root cells. Often the fungal and plant cell walls become almost indistinguishable where they meet, making it easy for nutrients to be shared. In many ectomycorrhizas the Hartig net hyphae lack internal divisions, creating a multinuclear transfer cell-like structure that facilitates interhyphal transport. The hyphae have a high concentration of organelles responsible for energy and protein production (mitochondria and rough endoplasmic reticulum) at their tips. There are signs that transporters in both fungal and plant plasma membranes are active, suggesting a bidirectional nutrient exchange.

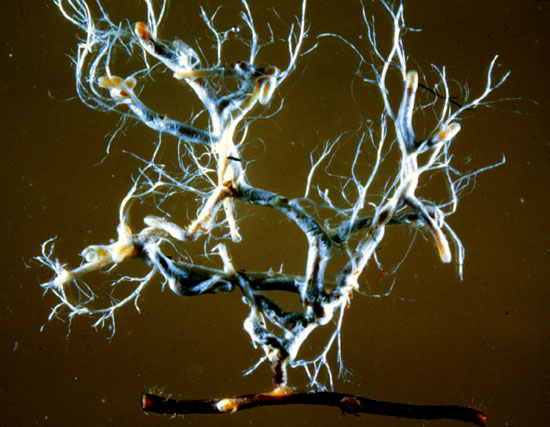
Ectomycorrhiza with Douglas-fir (Pseudotsuga menziesii) and Cortinarius spp.

The structure of the EcM network depends on the availability of nutrients. When nutrient availability is low, the investment in the underground network is high relative to above-ground growth. Phosphorus is another typically limiting nutrient in many terrestrial ecosystems. Evidence suggests that phosphorus is transferred largely as orthophosphate. Some mat-forming ectomycorrhizas contain ribonucleases capable of rapidly degrading DNA to obtain phosphorus from nuclei.

=== Non-nutritional benefits ===
Extraradical hyphae, particularly rhizomorphs, can also offer invaluable transport of water. Often these develop into specialized runners that extend far from the host roots, increasing the functional water access area. The hyphal sheath enveloping the root tips also acts as a physical barrier shielding plant tissues from pathogens and predators. There is also evidence that secondary metabolites produced by the fungi act as biochemical defense mechanisms against pathogenic fungi, nematodes and bacteria that may try to infect the mycorrhizal root. Many studies also show that EcM fungi allow plants to tolerate soils with high concentrations of heavy metals, salts, radionuclides and organic pollutants.

=== Ectendomycorrhiza ===
Although the Hartig net forms outside the root cells, penetration of plant cortical cells occasionally occurs. Many species of ectomycorrhizal fungi can function either as ectomycorrhizas or in the penetrative mode typical of arbuscular mycorrhizas, depending on the host. Because these associations represent a form of symbiosis in between arbuscular mycorrhizas and ectomycorrhizas, they are termed ectendomycorrhizas.

== Ecology ==
=== Biogeography and environmental gradients ===
Ectomycorrhizal fungi are found throughout boreal, temperate and tropical ecosystems, primarily among the dominant woody-plant-producing families. Many of the fungal families common in temperate forests (e.g. Russulaceae, Boletaceae, Thelephoraceae) are also widespread in the Southern Hemisphere and tropical dipterocarp forests: although the plant families are quite different in temperate and tropical forests, the ectomycorrhizal fungi are fairly similar. The types of EcM fungi are affected by soil types both in the field and in the lab.

For most types of plants and animals, species diversity increases towards the equator. This is called the latitudinal gradient of diversity (LGD). In contrast, there is evidence that EcM fungi may be at maximum diversity in the temperate zone. If this is the case, it might be explained by one or more of the following hypotheses: 1) EcM fungi may have evolved at higher latitudes with Pinaceae hosts, and be less able to compete in tropical climates; 2) the plants EcMs use as hosts might be more diverse in temperate conditions, and the structure of the soil in temperate regions may allow for higher niche differentiation and species accumulation; and 3) tropical EcM hosts are spread out more sparsely in small isolated forest islands that may reduce the population sizes and diversity of EcM fungi.

=== Host specificity and community responses ===
Most EcM hosts show low levels of specificity, and can form symbioses with many distantly related fungi. This may have evolutionary benefits to the plant in two ways: 1) the plant's seedlings are more likely to be able to form mycorrhizas in a wide array of habitats; and 2) the plant can make use of different fungi that vary in their ability to access nutrients.

EcM fungi exhibit various levels of specificity for their plant hosts, and the costs and benefits to their specialization are not well understood. For example, the suilloid group, a monophyletic assemblage containing the genera Suillus, Rhizopogon, Gomphidius and others, shows an extreme degree of specificity, with almost all of its members forming ectomycorrhizas with members of the Pinaceae. However, many other fungal groups exhibit a very broad host range.

Host plants that are taxonomically related have more similar EcM fungal communities than do taxa that are more distantly related. Similarly, molecular phylogenetic studies have shown that fungi derived from a common ancestor are more likely to have hosts that are taxonomically related. The maturity of the host environment, or successional status, may also affect the variety of EcM fungal communities present. Other indirect factors can also play a role in the EcM fungal community, such as leaf fall and litter quality, which affect calcium levels and soil pH.

=== Roles in invasion ===
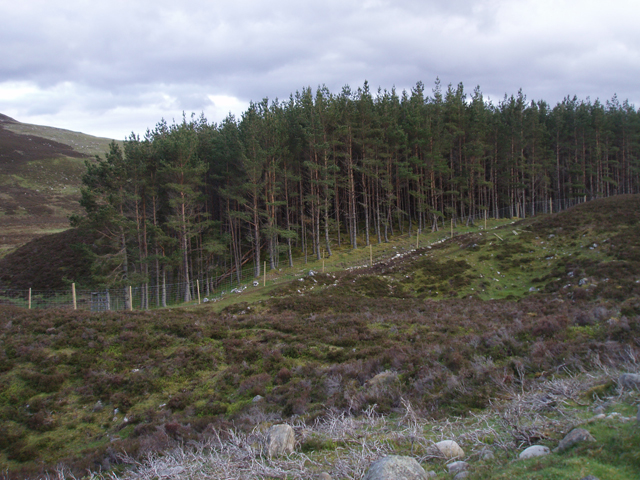
Pine plantation, probably inoculated with fungal spores to allow beneficial ectomycorrhizas to form

Plants that are not native to an area often require mycorrhizal symbionts to thrive. The vast majority of arbuscular mycorrhizas are non-specific, and so plants that interact with these mycorrhizas often become invasive quickly and easily. However, ectomycorrhizal symbioses are often relatively specific. In exotic forestry, compatible EcM fungi are often introduced to the foreign landscape to ensure the success of forest plantations. This is most common in eucalypts and pines, which are obligate ectomycorrhizal trees in natural conditions. Pines were difficult to establish in the southern hemisphere for this reason, and many Eucalyptus plantations required inoculation by EcM fungi from their native landscape. In both cases, once the EcM networks were introduced the trees were able to naturalize and then began to compete with native plants.

Many EcM species co-invade without the help of human activity, however. The family Pinaceae often invade habitats along with specific EcM fungi from the genera Suillus and Rhizopogon. There are also ectomycorrhiza-forming fungi with cosmopolitan distributions which can allow non-native plant species to spread in the absence of their specific EcM fungi from the native ecosystem.

Plants can compete through attacking each other's fungal networks. Dominant native plants can inhibit EcM fungi on the roots of neighboring plants, and some invasive plants can inhibit the growth of native ectomycorrhizal fungi, especially if they become established and dominant. Invasive garlic mustard, Alliaria petiolata, and its allelochemical benzyl isothiocyanate were shown to inhibit the growth of three species of EcM fungi grown on white pine seedlings. Changes in EcM communities can have drastic effects on nutrient uptake and community composition of native trees, with far-reaching ecological ramifications.

=== Competition and other plant symbionts ===
Competition among EcM fungi is a well-documented case of soil microbial interactions. In some experiments, the timing of colonization by competing EcM fungi determined which species was dominant. Many biotic and abiotic factors can mediate competition among EcM fungi, such as temperature, soil pH, soil moisture, host specificity, and competitor number, and these factors interact with each other in a complex way. There is also some evidence for competition between EcM fungi and arbuscular mycorrhizal fungi. This is mostly noted in species that can host both EcM and AM fungi on their roots.

Some soil bacteria, known as Mycorrhiza helper bacteria (MHBs), have been shown to stimulate EcM formation, root and shoot biomass, and fungal growth. Some argue that bacteria of this kind should be considered a third component of mycorrhizas. Other bacteria inhibit ectomycorrhizal formation.

=== Interactions with animals ===
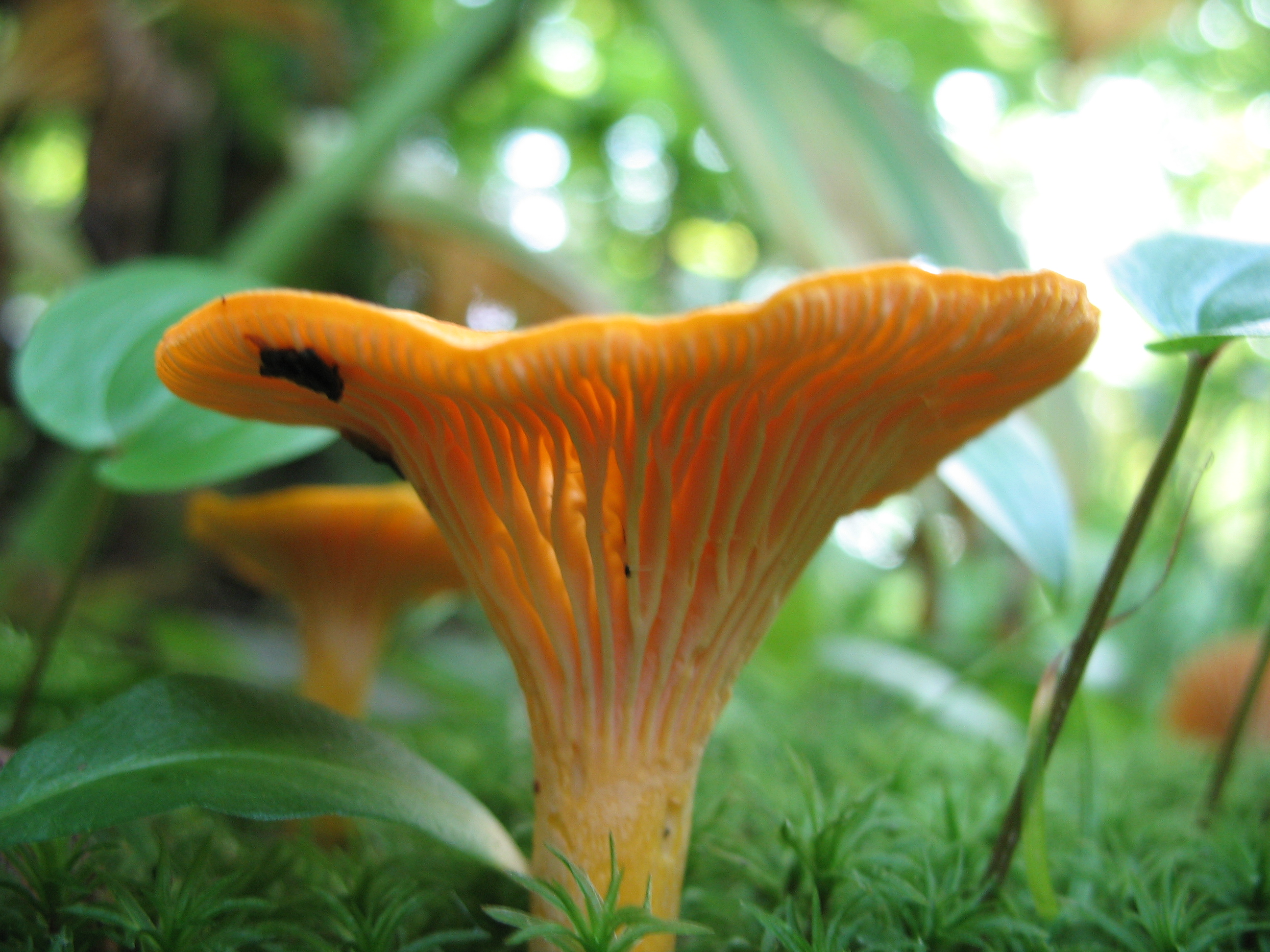
The edible epigeous fruiting body of Cantharellus cibarius, the golden chanterelle

Many ectomycorrhizal fungi rely upon mammals for the dispersal of their spores, particularly fungi with hypogeous fruiting bodies. Many species of small mammals are mycophages, eating a wide range of fungi and especially the fruiting bodies. Spores are dispersed either because the fruiting body is unearthed and broken apart, or after ingestion and subsequent excretion. Some studies even suggest that passage through an animal's gut promotes spore germination, although for most fungal species this is not necessary. By spreading the fungal spores, these animals have an indirect effect on plant community structure.

Other fruiting bodies are eaten by invertebrates such as mollusks and fly larvae, some of which are even tolerant to the toxic α-amanitin found in death caps. Below ground, nematodes and springtails also consume fungal tissue. The ectomycorrhizal fungus Laccaria bicolor has been found to lure and kill springtails to obtain nitrogen, some of which may then be transferred to the host plant. In one study, eastern white pine inoculated with L. bicolor was able to derive up to 25% of its nitrogen from springtails.

Edible fungi are important in societies throughout the world. Truffles, porcinis and chanterelles are known for their culinary and financial importance.

== Plant production ==
=== Agriculture ===
Ectomycorrhizal fungi are not prominent in agricultural and horticultural systems. Most of the economically relevant crop plants that form mycorrhizas tend to form them with arbuscular mycorrhizal fungi. Many modern agricultural practices such as tillage, heavy fertilizers and fungicides are extremely detrimental to mycorrhizas and the surrounding ecosystem. It is possible that agriculture indirectly affects nearby ectomycorrhizal species and habitats; for example, increased fertilization decreases sporocarp production.

=== Forestry ===
In commercial forestry, the transplanting of crop trees to new locations often requires an accompanying ectomycorrhizal partner. This is especially true of trees that have a high degree of specificity for their mycobiont, or trees that are being planted far from their native habitat among novel fungal species. This has been repeatedly shown in plantations involving obligate ectomycorrhizal trees, such as Eucalyptus and Pinus species. Mass planting of these species often requires an inoculum of native EcM fungi for the trees to prosper.

Sometimes ectomycorrhizal plantation species, such as pine and eucalyptus, are planted and promoted for their ability to act as a sink for atmospheric carbon. However, the ectomycorrhizal fungi of these species also tend to deplete soil carbon, making this use of plantations controversial.

=== Restoration ===
The role of ectomycorrhizas in supporting their host plants has led to the suggestion that EcM fungi could be used in restoration projects aimed at re-establishing native plant species in ecosystems disrupted by a variety of issues. Since the disappearance of mycorhizal fungi from a habitat constitutes a major soil disturbance event, their re-addition is an important part of establishing vegetation and restoring habitats.

== Resilience in challenging environments ==
=== Heavy metals ===
Heavy metals are toxic for living organisms. High soil concentrations of heavy metals such as zinc, copper, cadmium, lead, nickel, and chromium affect basic metabolic processes and can lead to cell damage and death. Some ectomycorrhizal fungi are tolerant to heavy metals, with many species having the ability to colonize contaminated soils. There are also cases of populations locally adapted to tolerate harsh chemical environments.

Fungi exhibit detoxification mechanisms to reduce heavy metal concentrations in their cells. These mechanisms include reducing heavy metal uptake, sequestering and storing heavy metals within the cell, and excretion. Heavy metal uptake can be reduced by sorption and metabolic inactivation at the cell wall and apoplast level. Ectomycorrhizal fungi also have the ability to bind considerable amounts of heavy metals. Once inside the cell, heavy metals can be immobilized in organo-metal complexes, made soluble, transformed into metallothioneins, involved in metal sequestration and/or stored in vacuoles in chemically inactive forms. Antioxidant detoxification systems may also be in place, reducing the production of free radicals and protecting the fungal cell. Fungi can export metals from the cytoplasm to the apoplast, a mechanism that also occurs in plants. Ectomycorrhizal fungi can also concentrate heavy metals in their fruiting bodies. Genetic differences between populations growing in toxic versus non-toxic habitats have rarely been reported, indicating that metal tolerance is widespread. No metal-adapted endemic taxa have been documented so far. There is, however, evidence for community shifts associated with heavy metals, with lower diversity associated with contaminated sites. On the other hand, soils naturally rich in heavy metals, such as serpentine soils, do not seem to affect the diversity of ectomycorrhizal fungal communities.

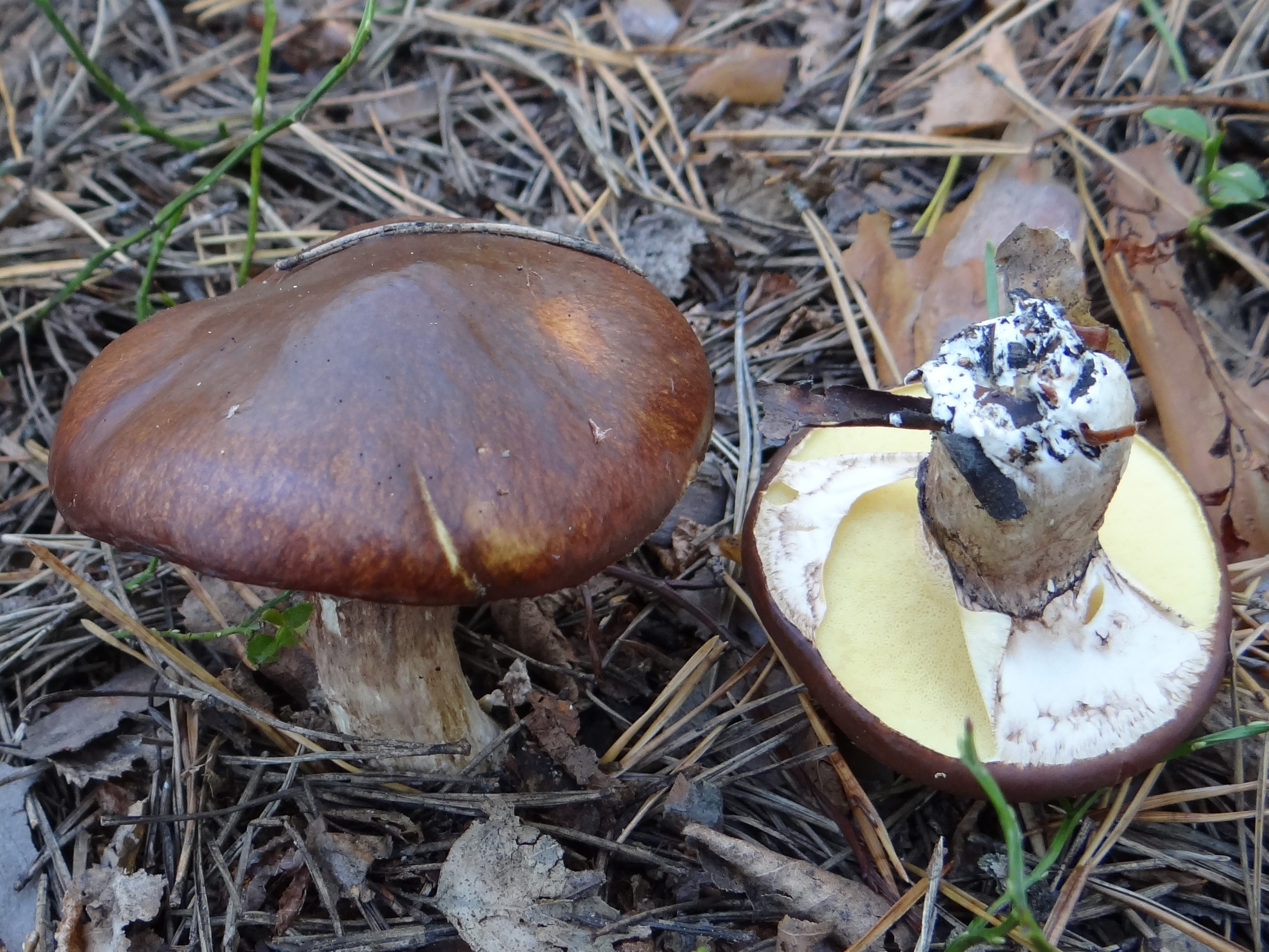
Suillus luteus, an ectomycorrhizal fungus with ecotypes that are known to be associated with heavy metal concentrations

Although widespread metal tolerance seems to be the norm for ectomycorrhizal fungi, it has been suggested that a few fungi such as Pisolithus tinctorius, P. albus and species in the genus Suillus can become adapted to high levels of Al, Zn, Cd and Cu. Suillus luteus and S. bovinus are good examples, with known ecotypes adapted to Zn, Cd and Cu.

=== Pollution and phytoremediation ===
EcM fungi have been found to have beneficial effects in several types of polluted environments, including:

• High salt: A number of studies have shown that certain EcM fungi can help their hosts survive high soil salinity conditions.

• Radionuclides: Many species of ectomycorrhizal fungi, including the Cortinariaceae, can hyperaccumulate radionuclides

• Organic pollutants: Some EcM species are capable of decomposing persistent organic pollutants (POPs) such as organochlorides and polychlorinated biphenyls (PCBs). Chemicals that can be detoxified by EcM fungi, either alone or in association with their host plant, include 2,4-dichlorophenol and tetrachloroethylene.

=== Climate change ===
Ectomycorrhizal communities can be affected by increased CO_{2} and the consequent effects of climate change. In some studies, elevated CO_{2} levels increased fungal mycelium growth and increased EcM root colonization. Other EcM associations showed little response to elevated CO_{2}.

Increased temperatures also give a range of responses, some negative, and others positive. The EcM response to drought is complex since many species provide protection against root desiccation and improve the ability of the roots to take up water. Thus, EcMs protect their host plants during times of drought, although they may themselves be affected over time.

=== Conservation ===
As the importance of below-ground organisms to forest productivity, recovery and stability becomes clear, conservation of ectomycorrhizas is gaining attention. Many species of EcM fungi in Europe have declined, due to factors including reduced tree vitality, conversion of forests to other uses, pollution and acidification of forest soils. It has been argued that conservation of ectomycorrhizas requires protection of species across their entire host range and habitat, to ensure that all types of EcM communities are preserved.

The Northwest Forest Plan, which governs land use on federal lands in the Pacific Northwest region of the United States, includes provisions for studying endangered fungi and developing strategies to manage and protect them. The European Council for the Conservation of Fungi was founded in 1985 to promote research on and attention to endangered fungi. In 2018, the Council collaborated with the Kew Royal Botanic Gardens to produce the State of the World's Fungi Report, 2018.

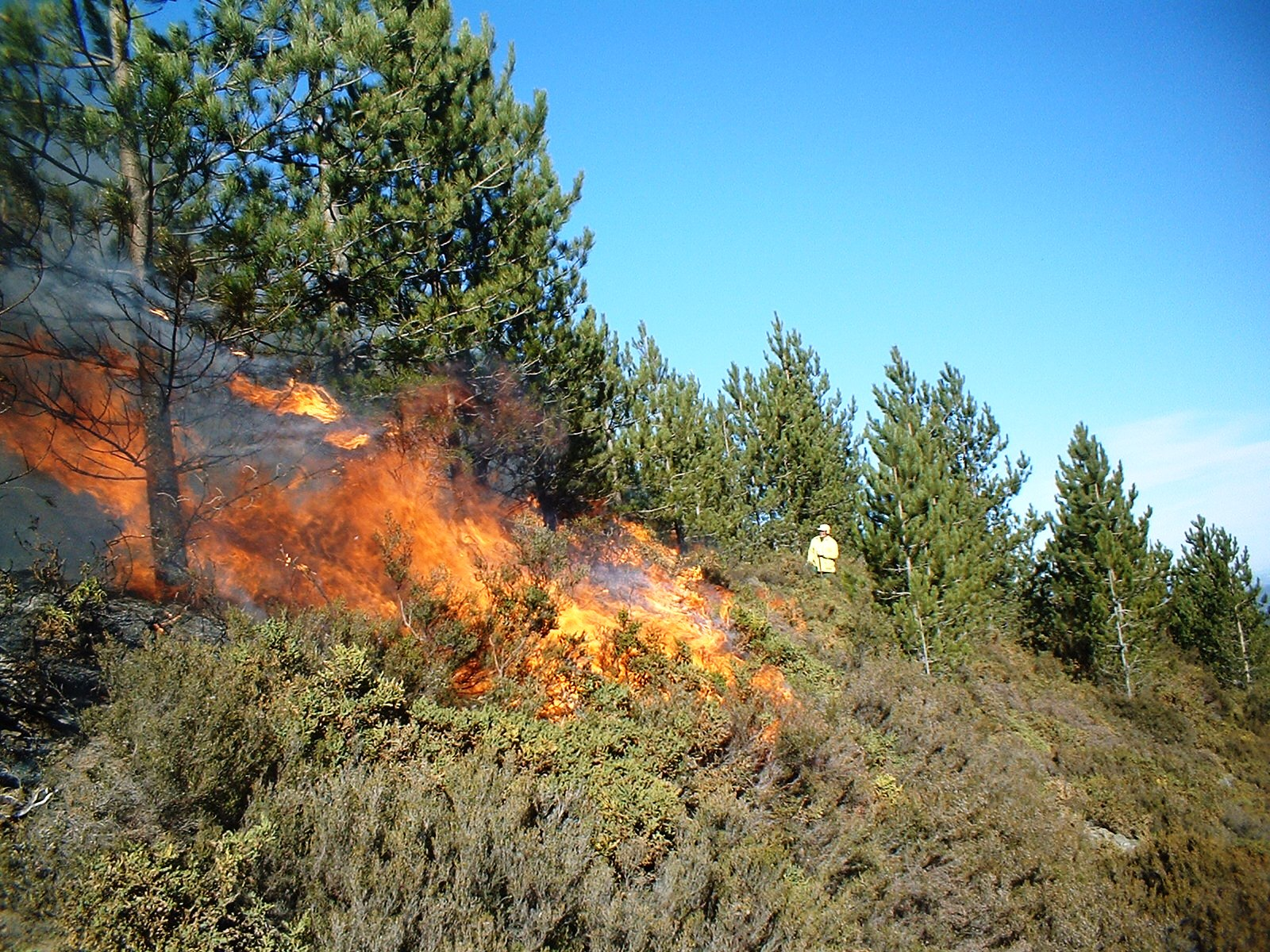
Prescribed burn in a stand of Pinus nigra

Conservation strategies include the maintenance of: 1) refuge plants and reservoir hosts to preserve the EcM fungal community after harvesting; 2) mature trees to provide seedlings with a diverse array of EcM fungi; and 3) old-growth stands that have diverse macro- and microhabitats and support varied EcM fungal communities. Preservation of natural forest floor constituents and retention of woody debris and substrates may also be important. In one study concerning Douglas-fir seedlings, removal of forest floor debris and soil compaction decreased EcM fungal diversity and abundance by 60%. Removal of pinegrass similarly reduced the diversity and richness of EcM fungi. Some strategies, such as prescribed burns, have different effects on different types of EcM communities, ranging from negative to neutral or positive.

Large ex situ culture collections of fungi, including ectomycorrhizal fungi, are maintained throughout the world as insurance against genetic loss. However, these collections are incomplete.

== See also ==
- Mycorrhizae and changing climate
- Orchid mycorrhiza
