= Mycorrhiza helper bacteria =

Group of organisms

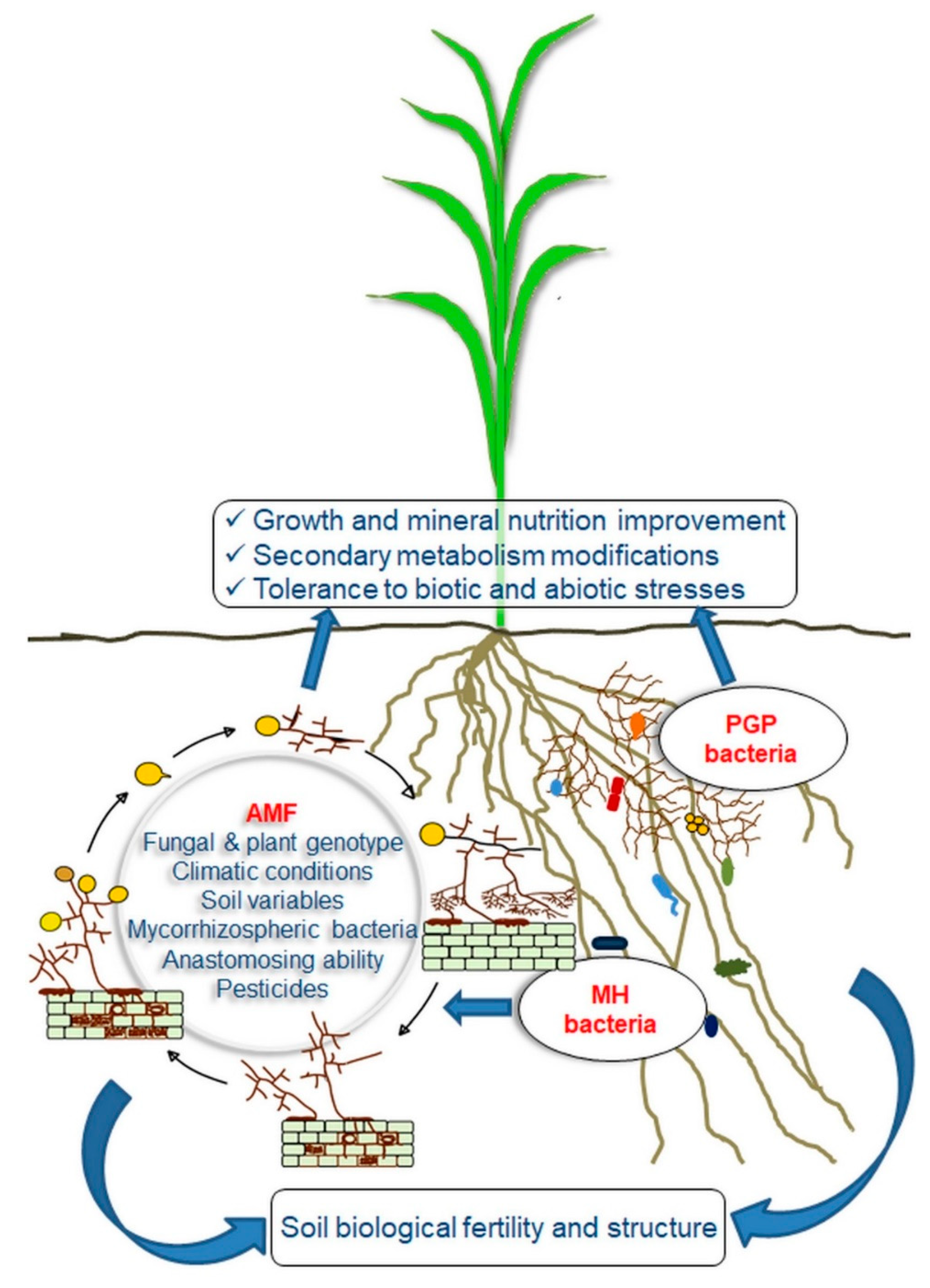
General association and effects of MHBs with mycorrhizal fungi.

Mycorrhiza helper bacteria (MHB) are a group of organisms that form symbiotic associations with both ectomycorrhiza and arbuscular mycorrhiza. MHBs are diverse and belong to a wide variety of bacterial phyla including both Gram-negative and Gram-positive bacteria. Some of the most common MHBs observed in studies belong to the genera Pseudomonas and Streptomyces. MHBs have been seen to have extremely specific interactions with their fungal hosts at times, but this specificity is lost with plants. MHBs enhance mycorrhizal function, growth, nutrient uptake to the fungus and plant, improve soil conductance, aid against certain pathogens, and help promote defense mechanisms. These bacteria are naturally present in the soil, and form these complex interactions with fungi as plant root development starts to take shape. The mechanisms through which these interactions take shape are not well-understood and needs further study.

== Taxonomy ==
MHBs consist of a diverse group of bacteria, often gram-negative and gram-positive bacteria. Most of the bacteria are associated with both ectomycorrhiza and arbuscular mycorrhiza, but some show specificity to a particular type of fungus. The common phyla that MHB belong to will be addressed in the following sections, as well as common genera.

=== Pseudomonadota ===
The Pseudomonadota (formerly Proteobacteria) are a large and diverse group of gram-negative bacteria containing five classes. Pseudomonas is in the gammaproteobacteria class. Specific bacteria within this genus are strongly associated as being MHBs in the rhizosphere of both ectomycorrhiza and arbuscular mycorrhiza. Pseudomonas fluorescens has been examined in several studies to understand how they work in benefiting the mycorrhiza and plant. In one study, they found that the bacteria helped ectomycorrhizal fungi promote a symbiotic relationship with the plant by examining an increase in formation of mycorrhiza when Pseudomonas fluorescens was applied to the soil. Some bacteria improve root colonization and plant growth when associated with arbuscular mycorrhiza. It has been hypothesized that MHBs aid the plant in pathogenic defense by improving the nutrient uptake from the soil, allowing plants to allocate more resources to broad defense mechanisms. However, the mechanism these species use to help both fungi is still unknown and needs to be further investigated.

=== Actinomycetota ===
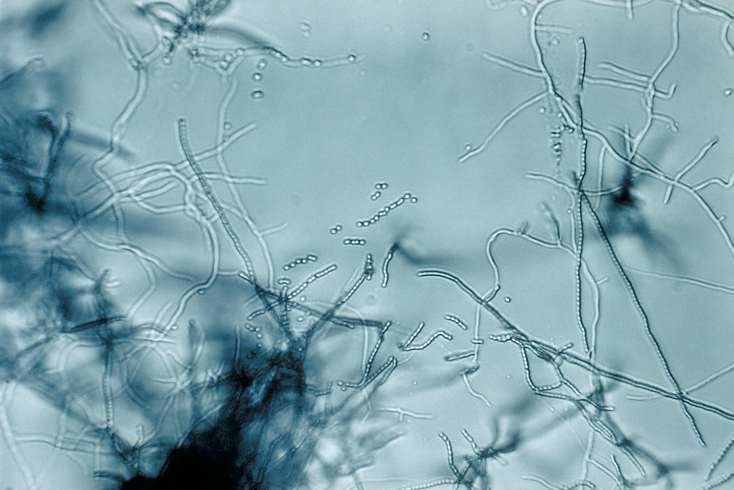
The branching shape of Streptomyces, a very common soil bacteria that often aids in the plant-mycorhiza relationship.

Actinomycetota are gram-positive bacteria and are naturally found in the soil. In this phylum, Streptomyces is the largest genus of bacteria, and are often associated with MHBs. Streptomyces have been a model organism of study in biological research on MHBs. In one study, it has been reported that Streptomyces are responsible for increasing root colonization, plant biomass growth, mycorrhizal colonization, and fungal growth. However, there is not just a single mechanism that the MHBs participate in. It has also been found that Streptomyces interact with ectomycorrhiza and arbuscular mycorrhiza. While these interactions need further understanding, they seem to be extremely common in natural soil.

=== Bacillota ===
Bacillota are gram-positive bacteria, many of which have a low GC content in their DNA. There are a few genera that act as MHBs, but one of the most common is Bacillius. Bacillius belong to the class Bacilli, and are rod-shaped organisms that can be free-living or pathogenic. However, in the presence of mycorrhiza some species can be beneficial and are considered to be MHBs. Since they are common, they can form a relationship with ectomycorrhiza and arbuscular mycorrhiza, similar to the previous genera. Bacillius aids in the establishment and growth of mycorrhiza, and helps with the fixation of nitrogen in the rhizosphere.

== Impact ==
MHBs are known to have several functions when interacting with the roots of plants and growth of fungi. In several studies it has been reported that MHBs can help fungi by increasing mycelial growth and aid in nutrient intake. The mycelial increase allows for fungi to absorb more nutrients, increasing its surface area.

=== Growth promoted by nutrients ===
Some MHBs are known to help break down molecules to a more usable form. MHBs can obtain both inorganic and organic nutrients in the soil through a direct process known as mineral-weathering which aids in the recycling of nutrients throughout the environment. The process of mineral-weathering releases protons and iron into the soil. This results in a lowering of the pH. A diverse group of bacteria can participate in the mineral- weathering process, such as Pseudomonas, Burkholderia, and Collimonas. The acidification of the soil by MHBs is hypothesized to be linked to their glucose metabolism.

MHBs also help gather unavailable phosphorus from the surrounding soil. Phosphate solubilizing rhizobacteria are the most common MHB that aids in phosphorus uptake. The bacteria are involved in this process by releasing phosphate-degrading compounds in the soil to break down organic and inorganic phosphate. As a result, the MHB create a pool of phosphate that the mycorrhiza then use. The bacteria work in phosphorus-limited conditions to help the mycorrhiza establish and grow. Streptomyces can assist arbuscular mycorrhiza in phosphorus-limited conditions through a similar process.

MHBs in the rhizosphere often have the capability to acquire nitrogen that the plant can use. The MHBs are able to fix nitrogen in the soil, and create pools of available nitrogen. However, MHBs do not cause plant modifications as legumes do, to help with nitrogen-fixation. Nitrogen-fixation is done only in the surrounding soil in relation to the mycorrhiza. In one study, researchers reported that a Bacillius MHB contributed to the nitrogen-fixation, and among other factors helped the plant grow when inoculated with a fungus.

=== Plant growth hormones ===
It has been proposed (Kaska et al., 1994) that MHBs induce growth hormones in a plant, which helps the mycorrhiza interact with the lateral roots in soil. An increase of root formation was also observed when Pseudomonas putida produced growth hormones, and was inoculated with the arbuscular mycorrhiza Gigaspora rosea on a cucumber plant. The inoculation of both the MHB and the fungus allowed for an increase in root elongation and growth in the soil, similar to the previous study. In another study, it was found that MHB can release gaseous compounds to attract and aid in the growth of fungi. The introduction of growth hormones and gaseous compounds produced by MHBs was only discovered recently, and requires further study on how MHBs influence the mycorrhiza symbiotic relationship and root growth.

=== Alteration of fungal genes aiding in growth ===
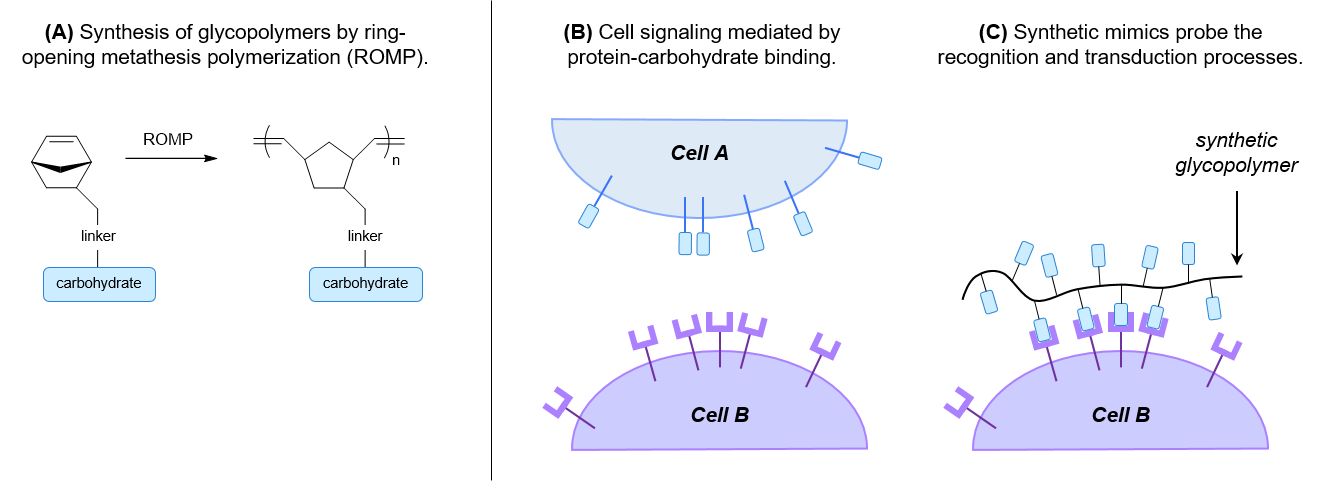
An example of cell-signaling, a proposed method for communication between MHBs and their fungal hosts allowing for recognition and co-colonization of plants.

Researchers have reported that fungal genes can be altered in the presence of an MHB. In one study, it was hypothesized that in the presence of a fungus, an MHB will promote an increase in the expression of a gene that helps to promote growth in the fungus. The fungus changes its genes expression after the MHB has promoted growth of the fungus, thus the alteration of the gene is an indirect effect. This is likely the cause of certain compounds or signals released by the MHBs, and further analysis is needed to better understand this communication.

=== Interactions with specific fungi ===
Only certain bacteria are specific to mycorrhizal fungi groups. Results have shown that the indigenous arbuscular mycorrhizal fungi of the clover plant could only grow in the presence Pseudomonas putida, but in fact, the plant could grow with the presence of multiple bacteria. It has been hypothesized that rhizosphere helper bacteria, in the soil, have developed traits to aid them in competition for inoculating fungi in their environment. Thus, it is plausible that MHBs select for certain fungi and developed some specificity towards a fungus that favors the bacteria.

== Detoxifying soil ==
MHBs help mycorrhiza establish symbiotic associations in stressful environments such as those high in toxic metals. In harsh environments, the bacteria assist in acquiring more nutrients such as nitrogen and phosphorus. MHBs help to prevent the uptake of toxic metals including lead, zinc, and cadmium. The bacteria decrease the amount of metals taken up by the plant through blockade mechanisms. The blockade of the toxic metals by the bacteria allows the fungus to form a stronger symbiotic association with the plant, and promotes the growth of both. Another proposed mechanism of MHBs in toxic environments is that the bacteria aid the mycorrhiza by compensating for the negative effects the toxic metal imposed. The MHBs help by increasing the plant nutrition uptake, and creating a balance between the macronutrients and micronutrients. Thus, MHBs have mechanisms to help the plant tolerate harsh and otherwise unsuitable environments. This relationship makes them great candidates for bioremediation.

== With pathogenic fungi ==
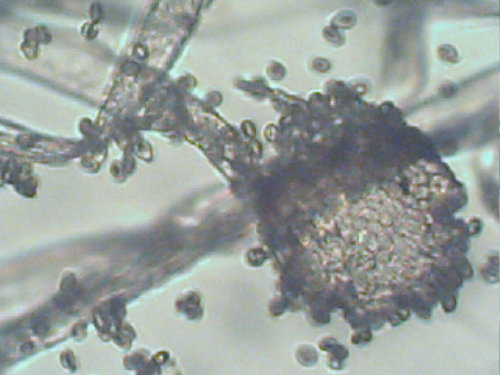
Pathogenic fungi, able to harm other fungi or plants.

In the presence of a pathogenic fungus, most studies show that MHBs aid in fighting off pathogens. However, there have been a few cases where MHBs help to promote pathogenic effects of a fungus.

=== Assisting pathogenic fungi ===
There have been a few studies that have found that MHBs aid pathogenic fungi. One study showed that MHBs aided in colonization of a type of fungal pathogen because the surrounding environment was unsuitable for the symbiotic mycorrhiza. Thus the MHB became more harmful under certain conditions to increase their own fitness. Researchers have also found that MHBs help the pathogenic fungus to colonize on the surface of the plant. This has a negative effect on the plant, by increasing the deleterious effects of the fungus. Another proposed mechanism is that MHBs alter the defense mechanism of the plant, by shutting off degrading peroxidase enzymes, and allowing the pathogenic fungus to inoculate the plant.

=== Defending against pathogenic fungi ===
In several studies, researchers have proposed numerous ways MHBs defend against pathogens. In one experiment researchers observed that MHBs produced acid in the surrounding environment, which helped to fight off various pathogens. It has also been hypothesized that the defense mechanism against pathogens is from a combination of both fungi and plant. Another study found that MHBs release antifungal metabolites into the soil. The anti-fungal metabolites produce antagonistic effects towards the pathogenic fungi. However, MHBs can help defend a pathogen depending on the nutrient availability and space in the rhizosphere. Further research is still necessary to understand the mechanism of how MHBs aid mycorrhiza in order to defeat pathogens, and if this role is symbiotic or more mutualistic in nature.
