= Spitzenkörper =

Organizing center for fungal hyphae

Four parallel microscopic views of a growing Neurospora crassa hypha, with the Spitzenkörper clearly visible at the tip (e.g. in red at the bottom lane)

The Spitzenkörper (German for 'pointed body', SPK) is a structure found in fungal hyphae that is the organizing center for hyphal growth and morphogenesis. It consists of many small vesicles and is present in growing hyphal tips, during spore germination, and where branch formation occurs. Its position in the hyphal tip correlates with the direction of hyphal growth. The Spitzenkörper is a part of the endomembrane system in fungi.

The vesicles are organized around a central area that contains a dense meshwork of microfilaments. Polysomes are often found closely to the posterior boundary of the Spitzenkörper core within the Ascomycota, microtubules extend into and often through the Spitzenkörper and within the Ascomycota Woronin bodies are found in the apical region near the Spitzenkörper.

The cytoplasm of the extreme apex is occupied almost exclusively by secretory vesicles. In the higher fungi (Ascomycota and Basidiomycota), secretory and endocytic vesicles are arranged into a dense, spherical aggregation called the Spitzenkörper or ‘apical body’. The Spitzenkörper may be seen in growing hyphae even with a light microscope. Hyphae of the Oomycota and some lower Eumycota (notably the Zygomycota) do not contain a recognizable Spitzenkörper, and the vesicles are instead distributed more loosely often in a crescent-shaped arrangement beneath the apical plasma membrane.

This structure is most commonly found in Dikarya and was at first thought to only occur among them. Vargas et al 1993 however were the first to find a Spitzenkörper in another clade, specifically the Allomyces (Blastocladiomycota), then subsequently Basidiobolus ranarum – which has been placed in several different phyla – was also found to have an SPK. As of 2020 these and the Blastocladiella (also in Blastocladiomycota) are the only known taxa to bear this structure.
