= Common symbiosis signaling pathway =

Common Symbiotic Pathway - a simplified presentation based on McLean, Bravo and Harrison 2017

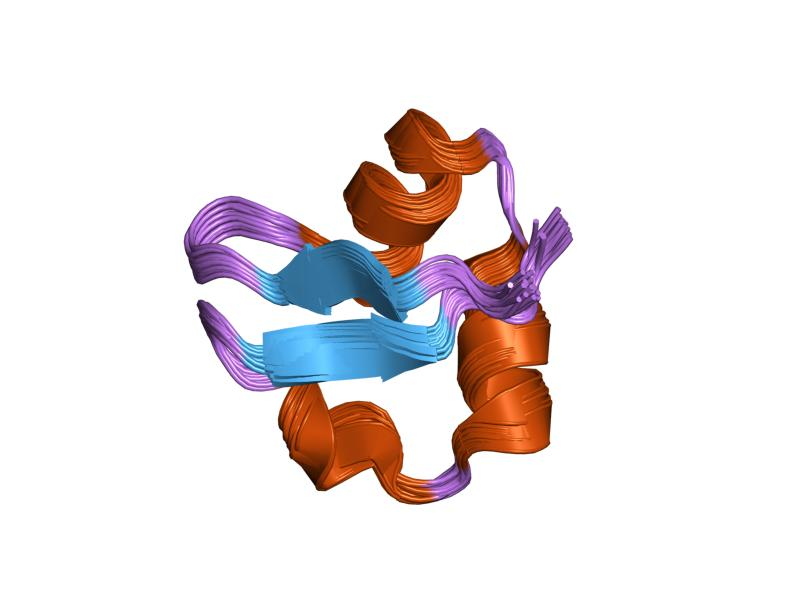
A LysM Domain

The common symbiosis signaling pathway (CSSP) is a highly conserved signaling cascade in plants that allows them to interact with symbiotic microbes. It corresponds to an ancestral pathway that plants use to interact with arbuscular mycorrhizal fungi (AMF). It is known as "common" because different evolutionary younger symbioses also use this pathway, notably the root nodule symbiosis with nitrogen-fixing rhizobia bacteria. The pathway is activated by both Nod-factor perception (for nodule forming rhizobia), as well as by Myc-factor perception that are released from AMF. The pathway is distinguished from the pathogen recognition pathways, but may have some common receptors involved in both pathogen recognition as well as CSSP. A recent work by Kevin Cope and colleagues showed that ectomycorrhizae (a different type of mycorrhizae) also uses CSSP components such as Myc-factor recognition.

The AMF colonization requires the following chain of events that can be roughly divided into the following steps:

1: Pre-Contact Signaling

2: The CSSP

2: A: Perception

2: B: Transmission

2: C: Transcription

3: The Accommodation program

== Overview of the pathway ==
The common symbiosis signaling pathway occurs within plant root cells. It links the perception of fungal or bacterial signals to plant transcriptional responses required for accommodation of the symbiont via arbuscule or nodule formation.

Myc factors or Nod factors are perceived by LysM receptor-like kinases at the plant plasma membrane, triggering downstream signaling through additional proteins such as SYMRK. The signal is then transduced to the nucleus, where it generates nuclear calcium oscillations via ion channels and nucleoporins. These calcium signals are decoded by the calcium- and calmodulin-dependent protein kinase CCaMK, which activates transcription factors such as CYCLOPS.

CYCLOPS is generally considered the final component of the canonical CSSP. At this point in nodulation or AMF colonisation, downstream responses diverge depending on the symbiosis, with CYCLOPS regulating genes that control the formation of either arbuscules or nodules.

Rhizobial bacteria and Arbuscular mycorrhizal fungi: two different kinds of symbionts elicit a similar signaling pathway
A TEM section of root nodule showing symbiosome made by Rhizobia, a kind of nitrogen fixing bacteria, in this case Bradyrhizobium japonicum in soybean root.	An arbuscle formed by Arbuscular mycorrhizal fungus Rhizophagus irregularis in Maize root, stained with WGA-Alexa fluor, seen using fluorescence microscopy.

== Pre-Contact Signaling ==
Chemical signaling between plants and symbiotic microorganisms begins prior to physical contact. In arbuscular mycorrhizal symbiosis, host plants synthesize and secrete strigolactones into the rhizosphere, which stimulate hyphal branching and directional growth of fungi towards the root.

Strigolactones are carotenoid-derived signalling molecules that have a conserved tricyclic lactone structure also known as ABC rings. Strigolactone biosynthesis occurs mainly in plastids, through the action of enzymes including D27 (Rice DWARF 27; Arabidopsis ortholog ATD27), an iron-binding beta-carotene isomerase, and carotenoid cleavage dioxygenases (CCD7 and CCD8).

In addition to strigolactones, other signaling molecules contribute to pre-contact communication in AMF symbiosis. The transporter protein NOPE1 ('NO PERCEPTION 1') is also required for AMF colonisation in rice and maize, and appears to function as part of a parallel signaling mechanism. NOPE1 is a member of the major facilitator superfamily of transport proteins. It imports N-acetylglucosamine (GlcNAc), a fungal-derived molecule, into plant cells, allowing them to detect the presence of nearby fungi. NOPE1 is involved in the production of root exudates that induce fungal transcription, but whether it directly exports signaling molecules or acts indirectly via GlcNAc uptake and downstream signaling remains unresolved.

Internal plant signaling pathways upstream of the CSSP are also important for symbiosis. D14L/KAI2 is an α/β-hydrolase receptor which perceives endogenous karrikin-like molecules (KLs). KLs, associated with phosphate starvation responses, trigger D14L and D3-mediated degradation of SMAX1. Removal of SMAX1 derepresses genes required for the CSSP, including the LysM receptor-like kinases (RLKs) that detect the fungal/bacterial signal and initiate the CSSP.

Pre-contact signaling ultimately enables the perception of fungal or bacterial signals by plant receptor-like kinases, leading to activation of the common symbiosis signaling pathway.

== Perception ==
The chemical structure of MycRi-IV (C16:0,S), a Myc factor of Rhizophagus irregularis as indicated in Maillet, F et al. (2011) "Fungal lipochitooligosaccharide symbiotic signals in arbuscular mycorrhiza." Nature 469:58–63.The factor was first identified by Fabienne Maillet and coworkers in a groundbreaking work published in Nature, where they have extracted three hundred litre mycorrhized carrot roots and exudates from 40 million germinating spores of Rhizophagus irregularis and purified the active fraction. They demonstrated this active principle is lipo-chito-oligosaccharide in nature.

There are two main type of root symbiosis; one is root nodule symbiosis by Rhizobia (RN-type) and another is Arbuscular Mycorrhiza (AM-type). There are common genes involved in between these two pathways. these key common components, form the Common Symbiosis pathway (CSP or CSSP). It has been proposed that, RN symbiosis has originated from AM symbiosis. The perception of the presence of the fungal symbiont takes place mainly through fungal chemical secretions generally termed as Myc-factors. Receptors for Myc-factors are yet to be identified. However, DMI2/SYMRK probably acts as a co-receptor of Myc factor receptor (MFR). The AM fungal secreted materials relevant to symbiosis are Myc-LCOs, Myc-COs, N-Acetylglucosamine

Fungal Myc-factors and the plant protein they act on
Myc factor	Plant protein it mainly act on
Myc-LCOs	LYS11 in Lotus japonicus
Short chain chitin oligomers (COs)	OsCERK1 and OsCEBiP in rice
N-acetylglucosamine	NOPE-1 in maize

=== Fungal Molecules that triggers CSSP ===
==== Myc-LCOs (lipochitooligosaccharides) ====
Like Rhizobial LCOs (Nod factors); Myc-LCOs play important role in perception stage. They are a kind of secreted compounds from AM fungi, mainly mixtures of lipo-chito-oligosaccharides (Myc-LCOs). In Lotus japonicus, LYS11, a receptor for LCOs, was expressed in root cortex cells associated with intra-radical colonizing arbuscular mycorrhizal fungi

==== Short chain chitin oligomers (Myc-COs) ====
AM host plants show symbiotic-activated calcium waves upon exposure to short chain chitin oligomers. It has been reported that production of these molecules by the AM fungus Rhizophagus irregularis, is strongly stimulated upon exposure to strigolactones. This suggests that plants secrete strigolactones and in response, the fungus increases short chain chitin oligomers, which in turns elicits the plant response to accommodate the fungus. The lysine motif domain of OsCERK1 and OsCEBiP is thought to be involved in the perception of short chain chitin oligomers.

==== N-Acetylglucosamine ====
NOPE-1 is transporter (described above). NOPE-1 also shows a strong N-acetylglucosamine uptake activity, and is thought to be associated with recognition of presence of fungal symbiont.

Some plant proteins are suspected to recognise Myc-factors, and the rice OsCERK1 Lysin motif (LysM) receptor-like kinase, is one of them.

=== Cell Surface Receptors ===
Different families of LYSM Receptors

Some SYM genes respond to both RN and AM symbiosis. Some variants exclusively respond to any 1 type of the symbioses.

There are multiple families of pattern recognition receptors and co-receptors involved in recognition of microbial pathogens and symbionts. Some of the relevant families involved in CSSP, are Membrane bound LysMs (LYM), Soluble LysM Receptor like Protein, LYK (LysM receptors with active Kinase domain), LYR (LysM proteins with inactive kinase domain), etc.

Seemingly, different combinations of a LYK and LYR receptors perceive and generate differential signals, such as some combinations generate a pathogen recognition signal whereas some combinations generate symbiotic signals.

==== Receptor-like Kinases (RLKs) ====
DMI2/ SYMRK is a receptor-like kinase, an important protein in endosymbiosis signal perception, reported in several plants (Mt-DMI2 or Mt-NORK in Medicago truncatula; Lj-SYMRK in Lotus japonicas; Ps-SYM19 in Pisum sativum; OsSYMRK in Rice). OsSYMRK lacks an N-terminal domain and exclusively regulate AM symbiosis (is not involved in the RN symbiosis). Notably, it has been found that a Nod-factor inducible gene, MtENOD11, is activated in the presence of AMF exudates; little is known about this phenomenon.

==== LysM receptor-like kinase ====
Lysin Motif (LysM) receptor-like kinase are a subfamily related to membrane bound Receptor-like kinase (RLKs) with an extracellular region consisting of 3 Lysine motifs. They have some important orthologs in different plants, that vary in their function. In some plant species they are involved in AM symbiosis, in others they are not. Tomato (Solanum lycopersicum), a non-legume eudicot, also have a similar LysM receptor, SlLYK10 that Promotes AM symbiosis. There are some co-receptors of Myc-factor receptor viz., OsCEBiP in Rice, a LysM membrane protein can function as a co-receptor of OsCERK1 but it participates in a different pathway.

Most of these kinases are serine/threonine kinases, some are tyrosine kinases. Also, they are type-1 transmembrane proteins, that indicates their N-terminal domain towards the outside of the cell, and the C-terminal domain is towards inside of the cell.

Cell surface receptors may work differently in different combinations. Same receptor can perform multiple function. Such as Oryza sativa CERK1 Receptor may trigger a PTI response (Pathogen triggered immunity) with Oryza sativa CEBiP as a co-receptor; in presence of CO8 Chitooligosaccharide. Whereas the same receptor CERK1 can play role in recognition of symbiotic signal, in presence of CO4 Chito-oligosaccharide, using SYMRK as a Co-receptor.

Important cell surface receptots involved in molecular pattern recognition
				Medicago truncatula	Lotus japonicus	Pisum sativum (pea)	Prunus persica	Arabidopsis thalliana	Brassica rapa	Solanum lycopersicum (Tomato)	Brachypodium distachyon	Oryza sativa (Rice)
Lysine Motif Receptor-Like Kinase and Lysine Motif Receptor like Protein	LYM		LYMI	LYM1			PpLYM1	AtLYM1 AtLYM3		SlLYM1	BdLYM1 BdLYM3	OsLYP6 OsLYP5, OsLYP4
Lysine Motif Receptor-Like Kinase and Lysine Motif Receptor like Protein	LYM		LYMII	LYM2			PpLYM3 PpLYM2	AtLYM2		SlLYM3 SlLYM2	BdLYM2 BdLYM4	OsCEBiP OsLYP3
Lysine Motif Receptor-Like Kinase and Lysine Motif Receptor like Protein	LYR	LYR 1	LYRIA	MtNFP MtLYR1	LjNFR5 LjLYS11		PpLYR1			SlLyk10	Bd LYR1	OsNFR5
Lysine Motif Receptor-Like Kinase and Lysine Motif Receptor like Protein	LYR	LYR 1	LYRIB	MtLYR8			PpLYR2			SlLYK9	Bd LYR2	
Lysine Motif Receptor-Like Kinase and Lysine Motif Receptor like Protein	LYR	LYR 2	LIRIIA	MtLYR10	LjLYS16		PpLYR6	AtLYK2		SlLYK2		
Lysine Motif Receptor-Like Kinase and Lysine Motif Receptor like Protein	LYR	LYR 2	LYRIIB	MtLYR9	LjLYS15		PpLYR7			SlLYK15		
Lysine Motif Receptor-Like Kinase and Lysine Motif Receptor like Protein	LYR	LYR 3	LYRIIIA	MtLYR3	LjLYS12		PpLYR3	AtLYK4		SlLYK4	Bd LYR4	OsLYK6
Lysine Motif Receptor-Like Kinase and Lysine Motif Receptor like Protein	LYR	LYR 3	LYRIIIB	MtLYR2			PpLYR4			SlLYK7 SlLYK6		
Lysine Motif Receptor-Like Kinase and Lysine Motif Receptor like Protein	LYR	LYR 3	LYRIIIC	MtLYR4 MtLYR7	LjLYS13 LjLYS14			AtLYK5			Bd LYR3	OsLYK3 OsLYK2, OsLYK4
Lysine Motif Receptor-Like Kinase and Lysine Motif Receptor like Protein	LYR	LYR 4	LYRIV	MtLYR5 MtLYR6	LjLYS20		PpLYR5					
Lysine Motif Receptor-Like Kinase and Lysine Motif Receptor like Protein	LYK		LYKI	LYK1, LYK4, LYK5, LYK6, LYK7, LYK2, LYK3, LYK9, LYK8	LjLYS2 LjLYS1, LjNFR1, LjLYS6, LjLYS7		PpLYK2 PpLyk1	AtLYK1/ AtCERK1		SlLYK13 SlLYK1/ SlBti9, SlLYK12, SlLYK11	BdLYK1	OsCERK1
Lysine Motif Receptor-Like Kinase and Lysine Motif Receptor like Protein	LYK		LYKII	LYK10	LjLYS3/ EPR3		PpLYK3 PpLYK4					
Lysine Motif Receptor-Like Kinase and Lysine Motif Receptor like Protein	LYK		LYKII				PpLYK5	AtLYK3		SlLYK3	BdLYK3	
Receptor like Kinase			RLK	Mt-DMI2/ Mt-NORK	Lj-SYMRK	Ps-SYM19						OsSYMRK

== Transmission ==
The transmission of signal cascades into the nucleus is not well understood. However, this transmission includes carrying the message up to the nuclear membrane and generation of a calcium wave. Some elements involved in this process are:

=== Nucleoporins ===
Lotus japonicus Nucleoporins LjNUP85 and LjNUP133 has potential role in transmission of the signal. Lj-NENA is another important nucleoporin that plays role in AM symbiosis.

=== HMGR and Mevalonate. ===
It has been proposed that the enzyme 3-hydroxy-3-methylglutaryl-CoA reductase (HMG CoA reductase or HMGR) has potential role in the transmission stage. The enzyme is activated by SYMRK/DMI2, and forms mevalonate. This mevalonate acts as a second messenger, and activates a nuclear potassium channel, DMI1 or POLLUX.

Important nuclear cation channels identified to be involved in C S S P
Nuclear envelope Protein	Function	Rice	Lotus japonicus	Medicago truncatula	Pisum
CNGC15	Cyclic-nucleotide gated Calcium-channel			Mt-CNGC15	
Castor	Potassium cation channel	Os-Castor	Lj-Castor		
POLLUX or DMI1	Potassium cation channel	OsPOLLUX	LjPOLLUX	Mt-DMI1	Ps-SYM8

=== Nuclear membrane cation channels. ===
The nuclear calcium channel CNGC15, which is cyclic nucleotide gated ion channel; mediates the symbiotic nuclear Ca^{2+} influx, and it is countered by K^{+} efflux by DMI1.

== Transcription ==
Some component of signalling cascade involved in transcription stage of the common symbiosis signalling
Protein	Function	Name of the Plant			
Protein	Function	Rice	Lotus japonicus	Medicago Truncatula	Pisum sativum
CCamK	Calcium calmodulin-dependent kinase with role in AMF symbiosis	Os-DMI3 or Os-CCaMK	Lj-CCaMK	Mt-DMI3	Ps-SYM9
CYCLOPS	Coiled coil domain containing proteins that respond to CCamK and promote AMF symbiosis	Os-CYCLOPS	Lj-CYCLOPS	Mt-IPD3	Ps-SYM33
DELLA	Promote AMF symbiosis	Os-SLR1		Mt-DELLA1 Mt-DELLA2	Ps-LA Ps-CRY

Calmodulin is a widespread regulatory protein that functions along with Ca^{2+} in various biological processes. In AM symbiosis signalling, it modulates CCaMK. CCaMK or DMI3 is a calcium-and-calmodulin-dependent kinase (CCaMK) thought to be a key decoder of Ca^{2+} oscillations and an important regulatory kinase protein. Nuclear Ca^{2+} spiking promotes binding of Ca^{2+} calmodulin with CCaMK. Binding of Ca^{2+} calmodulin with CCaMK causes conformational change of CCaMK that stimulates a target protein, CYCLOPS, which has different orthologs. CYCLOPS is a coiled coil domain containing protein possibly form a complex with CCaMK that works along with DELLA proteins. DELLA proteins are a kind of GRAS-domain protein originally identified as repressors of the Gibberellin signalling pathway, however now it is seen that DELLA participates in many signalling pathways. There are two DELLA proteins in Medicago truncatula and Pisum sativum that play a role in symbiosis whereas in rice only one DELLA protein fulfils this task. Reduced Arbuscular Mycorrhiza or RAM1 is a GRAS protein whose gene is directly regulated by DELLA and CCaMK/ CYCLOPS. By using chromatin immunoprecipitation assays, it has been shown that RAM1 binds to RAM2 gene promoter. RAM1 also regulates many of the plant genes that participate in AMF accommodation.

Some GRAS proteins play a role in AM symbiosis but these roles are not yet fully understood. These include RAM1, RAD1 (REQUIRED FOR ARBUSCLE DEVELOPMENT 1), MIG1 (MYCORRHIZA INDUCED GRAS1), NSP1 and NSP2. WRKY transcription factor genes are thought to play very important roles in establishment of mycorrhizal symbiosis and they perhaps work through regulating plant defense genes.

== The Accommodation program ==
Root cortex cells experience important changes in order to accommodate for the fungal endosymbiont. The pre-penetration apparatus (PPA) in outer cell layers and the peri-arbuscular membrane that surrounds arbuscules in inner cell layers need to be formed and the plant cell cytoplasm needs to rearrange, the vacuole retracts in size, the nucleus and nucleolus enlarge in size and chromatin decondense indicating heightened transcriptional activity. Plastids multiply and stay connected with "stromulus". Furthermore, it was suggested that the apoplastic longitudinal hyphal growth is probably regulated by plant genes such as taci1 and CDPK1.

=== Genes and proteins playing a role in the accommodation programme ===
Although various proteins have been identified which may play role on how this accommodation process occurs, the detailed signalling cascade is not fully understood. Some of the proteins and mechanisms involved in the deposition on peri-arbuscular membrane are EXOCYST complex, EXO70 subunit, a symbiosis-specific splice variant of SYP132, VAPYRIN, and two variants of VAMP721. Plant enzymes FatM and RAM2 and ABC transporter STR/STR2 are putatively involved in the synthesis and supplying of a lipid 16:0 β-monoacylglycerol to the AM fungi. Recently discovered kinases that regulate the AMF accommodation program include ADK1, AMK8, AMK24, ARK1 and ARK2.

The protein composition of the peri-arbuscular membrane is very different from that of the plasma membrane. It includes some special transporters such as phosphate transporters (Mt-PT4, Os-PT11, Os-PT13) and ammonium transporters (Mt-AMT2 and 3). It also includes ABC transporters such as STR/STR2 putatively involved in lipid transport.

== Evolutionary significance ==
AM fungi and plants co-evolved and developed a very complex interaction that allow the plant accommodate the AM-fungal host. It has been proposed that the RN symbiosis has originated from the AM symbiosis.

== See also ==
- Receptor tyrosine kinase
- Serine threonine kinase
- Pattern recognition receptors
- Monoglyceride
- Strigolactone
- Plant intelligence
- Cell signalling
- Signal transduction
- Pathogen Associated Molecular Pattern
- Microbe Associated Molecular Pattern
- Mutualism
- Karrikin signaling
- Mevalonate pathway
