= Meristem =

Type of plant tissue involved in cell proliferation

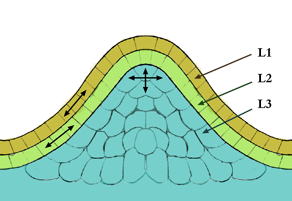
Tunica-corpus model of the apical meristem (growing tip). The epidermal (L1) and subepidermal (L2) layers form the outer layers called the tunica. The corpus (L3) will form the vascular and stem tissues. Cells in the outer layers divide in a sideways fashion relative to each other, which keeps these layers distinct, whereas the lower layer divides in a more random fashion in all directions.

In cell biology, the meristem is a structure composed of specialized tissue found in plants, consisting of stem cells, known as meristematic cells, which are undifferentiated cells capable of continuous cellular division. These meristematic cells play a fundamental role in plant growth, regeneration, and acclimatization, as they serve as the source of all differentiated plant tissues and organs. They contribute to the formation of structures such as fruits, leaves, and seeds, as well as supportive tissues like stems and roots.

Meristematic cells are totipotent, meaning they have the ability to differentiate into any plant cell type. As they divide, they generate new cells, some of which remain meristematic cells while others differentiate into specialized cells that typically lose the ability to divide or produce new cell types. Due to their active division and undifferentiated nature, meristematic cells form the foundation for the formation of new plant organs and the continuous expansion of the plant body throughout the plant's life cycle.

Meristematic cells are small cells, with thin primary cell walls, and small or no vacuoles. Their protoplasm is dense, filling the entire cell, and they lack intercellular spaces. Instead of mature plastids such as chloroplasts or chromoplasts, they contain proplastids, which later develop into fully functional plastids.

Meristematic tissues are classified into three main types based on their location and function: apical meristems, found at the tips of roots and shoots; intercalary or basal meristems, located in the middle regions of stems or leaves, enabling regrowth; and lateral meristems or cambium, responsible for secondary growth in woody plants. At the summit of the meristem, a small group of slowly dividing cells, known as the central zone, acts as a reservoir of stem cells, essential for maintaining meristem activity. The growth and proliferation rates of cells vary within the meristem, with higher activity at the periphery compared to the central region.

The term meristem was first used in 1858 by Swiss botanist Carl Wilhelm von Nägeli (1817–1891) in his book Beiträge zur Wissenschaftlichen Botanik ("Contributions to Scientific Botany"). It is derived from Greek μερίζειν (merizein) 'to divide', in recognition of its inherent function.

== Primary meristems ==
Apical meristems, also known as the primary meristem, give rise to the primary plant body and are responsible for primary growth, or an increase in length or height. Apical meristems may differentiate into three kinds of primary meristem:

- Protoderm: lies around the outside of the stem and develops into the epidermis.
- Procambium: lies just inside of the protoderm and develops into primary xylem and primary phloem. It also produces the vascular cambium, and cork cambium (part of the secondary meristems but descendants of apical meristematic cells). The cork cambium further differentiates into the phelloderm, or bark, (to the inside) and the phellem, or cork (to the outside). All three of these layers (cork cambium, phellem, and phelloderm) constitute the periderm. In roots, the procambium can also give rise to the pericycle, which produces lateral roots in eudicots.
- Ground meristem: Composed of ground tissue parenchyma, collenchyma and sclerenchyma cells that develop into the cortex and the pith.

== Secondary meristems ==
After the primary growth, lateral meristems develop as secondary plant growth. This growth adds to the plant in diameter from the established stem but not all plants exhibit secondary growth. There are two types of secondary meristems: the vascular cambium and the cork cambium.

- Vascular cambium, which produces secondary xylem and secondary phloem. This is a process that may continue throughout the life of the plant. This is what gives rise to wood in plants. Such plants are called arboraceous. This does not occur in plants that do not go through secondary growth, known as herbaceous plants.
- Cork cambium, which gives rise to the periderm, which replaces the epidermis with bark and cork for example.

== Apical meristems ==
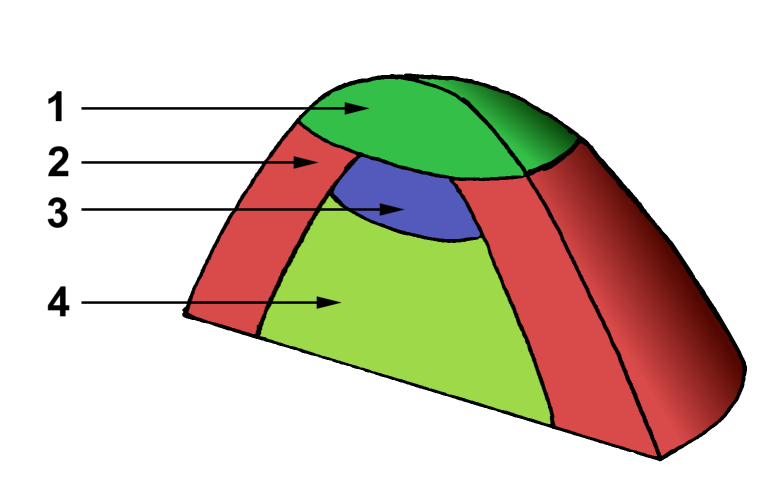
Organisation of an apical meristem (growing tip): 1. Central zone; 2. Peripheral zone; 3. Medullary (i.e. central) meristem; 4. Medullary tissue

Apical meristems are the completely undifferentiated (indeterminate) meristems of a plant. They give rise to primary growth, enabling the elongation of shoots and roots. Apical meristems give rise to three types of primary meristems, which later develop into secondary or lateral meristems, contributing to the plant's lateral expansion.

There are two main types of apical meristems: shoot apical meristem (SAM) and root apical meristem (RAM). The SAM is located at the tips of shoots and produces leaves, stems, and flowers, while the RAM is found at the tips of roots and generates new root tissues. Both types consist of rapidly-dividing cells that remain indeterminate, meaning they continuously produce new cells without a predefined final state, similar to stem cells in animals, which have an analogous behavior and function.

Structurally, apical meristems are organized into distinct zones. The central zone serves as a reservoir of undifferentiated cells, while the peripheral zone generates new organs and tissues. The medullary meristem contributes to vascular development, forming the medullary tissue, which makes up the plant's central structure. The meristem layers also vary depending on the plant type. The outermost layer, called the tunica, determines the leaf edge and margin in monocots, whereas in dicots, the second layer of the corpus influences leaf characteristics.

Apical meristems are generally found at the tips of roots and stems, but in some arctic plants, they are located in the lower or middle parts of the plant. This adaptation is believed to provide advantages in extreme environmental conditions.

=== Shoot Apical Meristems ===
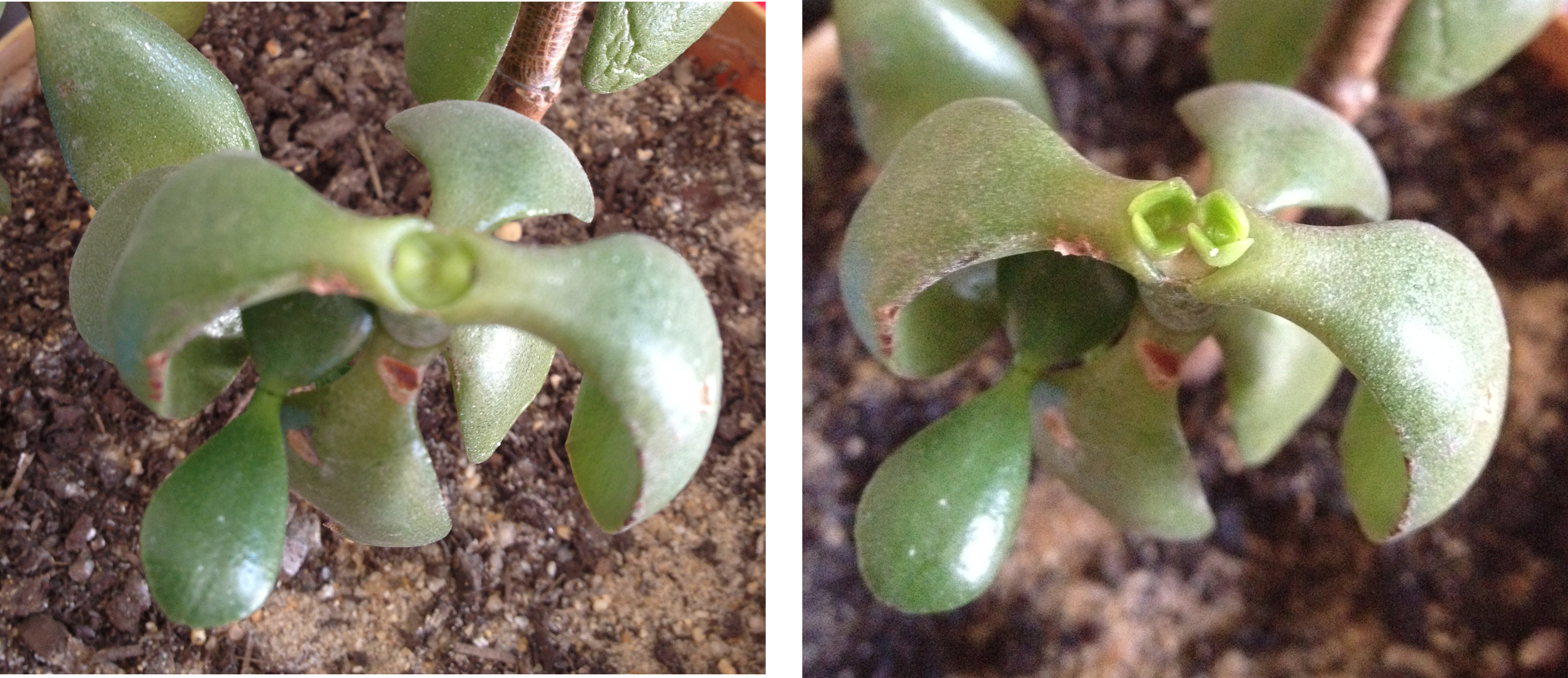
Shoot apical meristems of Crassula ovata (left). Fourteen days later, leaves have developed (right).

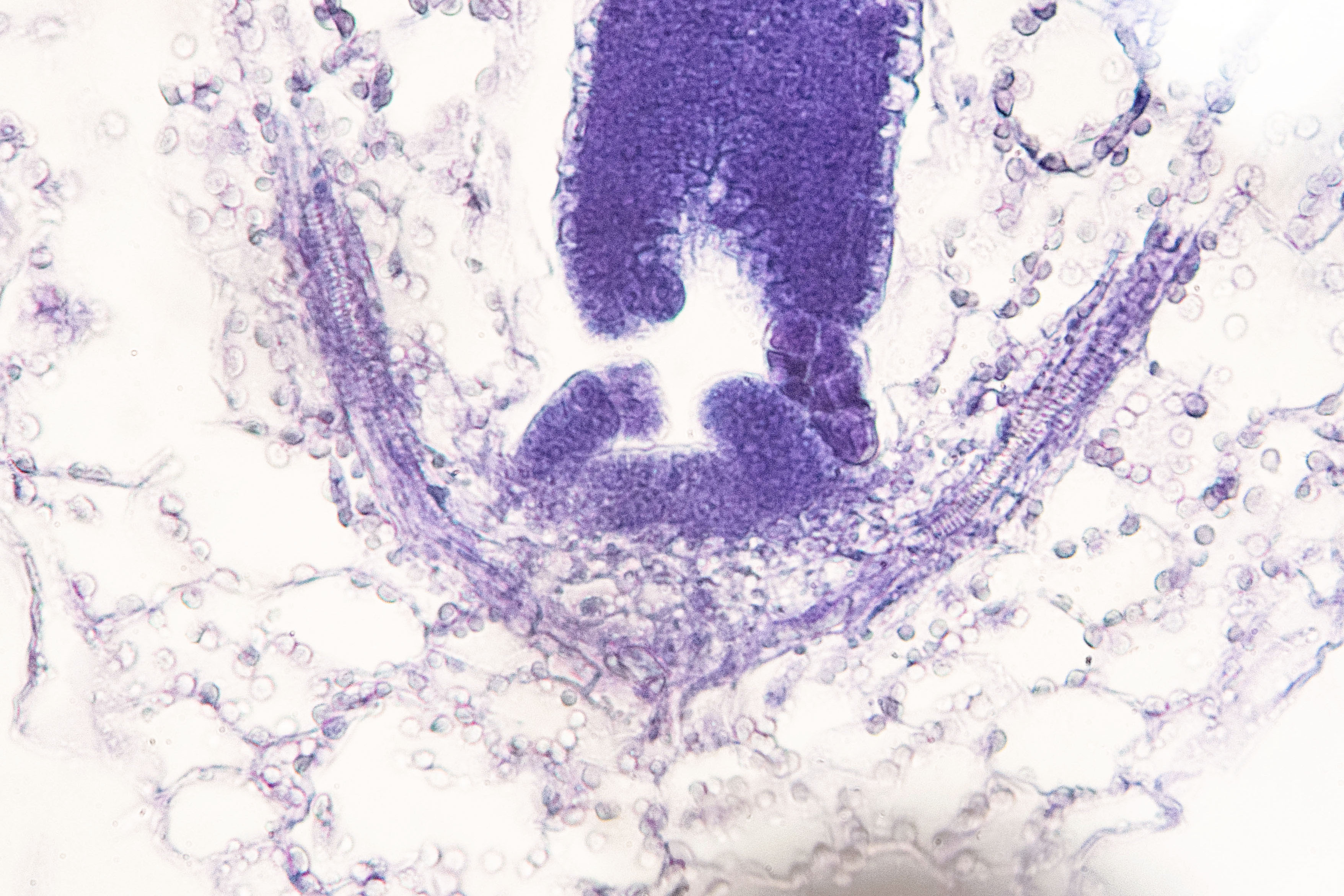
Microscopic image of a shoot apical meristem surrounded by leaf primordia of Arabidopsis thaliana.

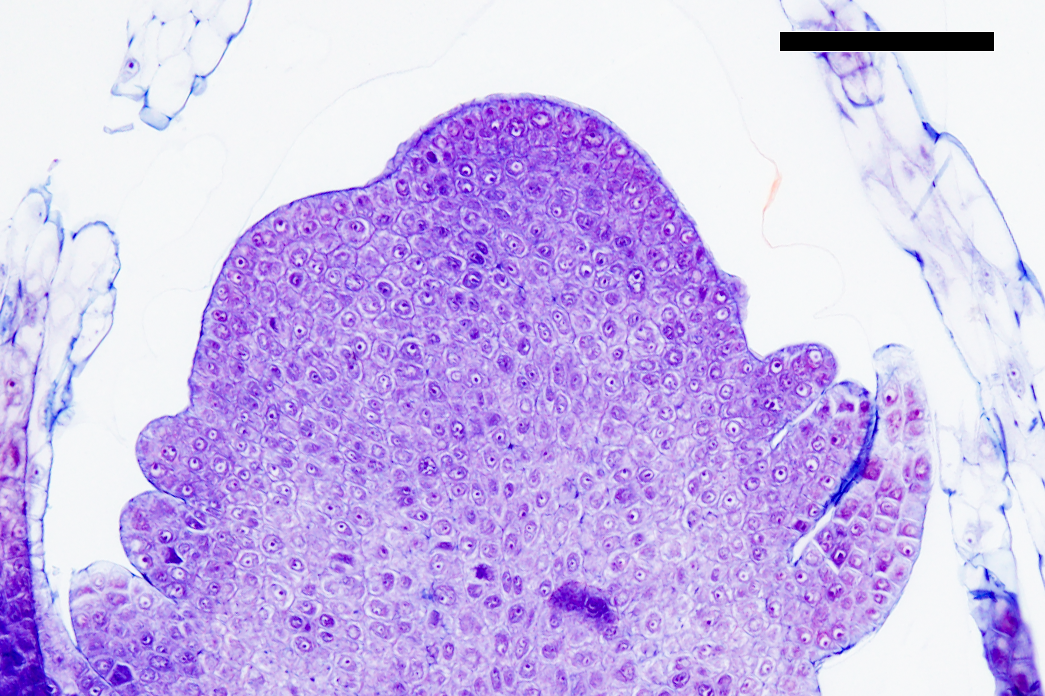
A microscopic image of shoot apical meristems containing multiple stem cells during dichotomy in Lycopodium clavatum (bar = 100 μm).

Shoot apical meristems are the source of all above-ground organs, such as leaves and flowers. Cells at the shoot apical meristem summit serve as stem cells to the surrounding peripheral region, where they proliferate rapidly and are incorporated into differentiating leaf or flower primordia.

The shoot apical meristem is the site of most of the embryogenesis in flowering plants. Primordia of leaves, sepals, petals, stamens, and ovaries are initiated here at the rate of one every time interval, called a plastochron. It is where the first indications that flower development has been evoked are manifested. One of these indications might be the loss of apical dominance and the release of otherwise dormant cells to develop as auxiliary shoot meristems, in some species in axils of primordia as close as two or three away from the apical dome.

The shoot apical meristem consists of four distinct cell groups:

- Stem cells
- The immediate daughter cells of the stem cells
- A subjacent organizing center
- Founder cells for organ initiation in surrounding regions

These four distinct zones are maintained by a complex signalling pathway. In Arabidopsis thaliana, 3 interacting CLAVATA genes are required to regulate the size of the stem cell reservoir in the shoot apical meristem by controlling the rate of cell division. CLV1 and CLV2 are predicted to form a receptor complex (of the LRR receptor-like kinase family) to which CLV3 is a ligand. CLV3 shares some homology with the ESR proteins of maize, with a short 14 amino acid region being conserved between the proteins. Proteins that contain these conserved regions have been grouped into the CLE family of proteins.

CLV1 has been shown to interact with several cytoplasmic proteins that are most likely involved in downstream signalling. For example, the CLV complex has been found to be associated with Rho/Rac small GTPase-related proteins. These proteins may act as an intermediate between the CLV complex and a mitogen-activated protein kinase (MAPK), which is often involved in signalling cascades. KAPP is a kinase-associated protein phosphatase that has been shown to interact with CLV1. KAPP is thought to act as a negative regulator of CLV1 by dephosphorylating it.

Another important gene in plant meristem maintenance is WUSCHEL (shortened to WUS), which is a target of CLV signaling in addition to positively regulating CLV, thus forming a feedback loop. WUS is expressed in the cells below the stem cells of the meristem and its presence prevents the differentiation of the stem cells. CLV1 acts to promote cellular differentiation by repressing WUS activity outside of the central zone containing the stem cells.

The function of WUS in the shoot apical meristem is linked to the phytohormone cytokinin. Cytokinin activates histidine kinases which then phosphorylate histidine phosphotransfer proteins. Subsequently, the phosphate groups are transferred onto two types of Arabidopsis response regulators (ARRs): Type-B ARRS and Type-A ARRs. Type-B ARRs work as transcription factors to activate genes downstream of cytokinin, including A-ARRs. A-ARRs are similar to B-ARRs in structure; however, A-ARRs do not contain the DNA binding domains that B-ARRs have, and which are required to function as transcription factors. Therefore, A-ARRs do not contribute to the activation of transcription, and by competing for phosphates from phosphotransfer proteins, inhibit B-ARRs function. In the SAM, B-ARRs induce the expression of WUS which induces stem cell identity. WUS then suppresses A-ARRs. As a result, B-ARRs are no longer inhibited, causing sustained cytokinin signaling in the center of the shoot apical meristem. Altogether with CLAVATA signaling, this system works as a negative feedback loop. Cytokinin signaling is positively reinforced by WUS to prevent the inhibition of cytokinin signaling, while WUS promotes its own inhibitor in the form of CLV3, which ultimately keeps WUS and cytokinin signaling in check.

=== Root apical meristem ===
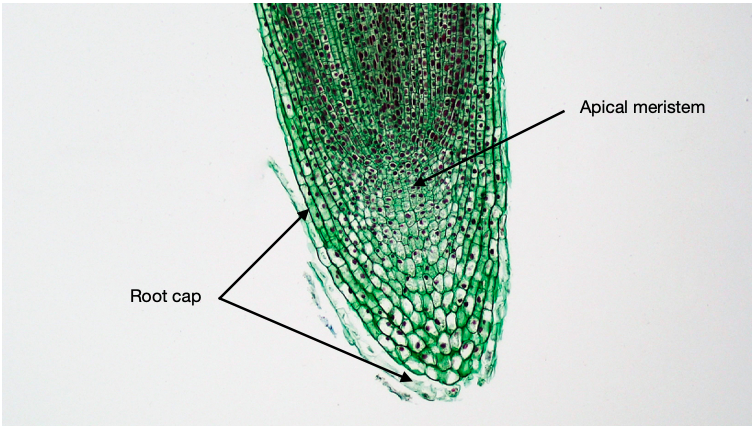

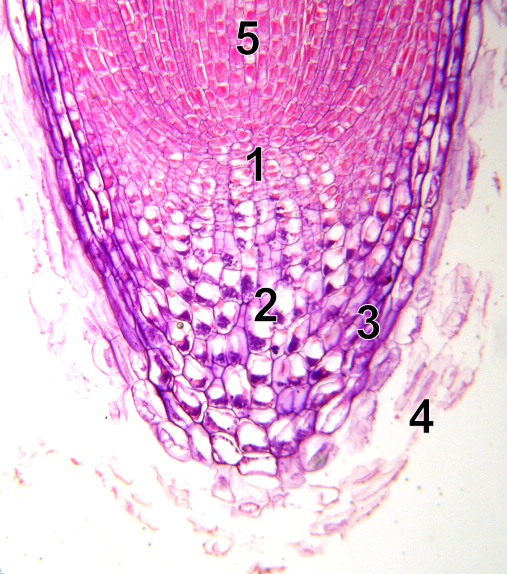
10× microscope image of root tip with meristem
1. quiescent center
2. calyptrogen (live rootcap cells)
3. rootcap
4. sloughed off dead rootcap cells
5. procambium

Unlike the shoot apical meristem, the root apical meristem produces cells in two dimensions. It harbors two pools of stem cells around an organizing center called the quiescent center (QC) cells and together produces most of the cells in an adult root. At its apex, the root meristem is covered by the root cap, which protects and guides its growth trajectory. Cells are continuously sloughed off the outer surface of the root cap. The QC cells are characterized by their low mitotic activity. Evidence suggests that the QC maintains the surrounding stem cells by preventing their differentiation, via signal(s) that are yet to be discovered. This allows a constant supply of new cells in the meristem required for continuous root growth. Recent findings indicate that QC can also act as a reservoir of stem cells to replenish whatever is lost or damaged. Root apical meristem and tissue patterns become established in the embryo in the case of the primary root, and in the new lateral root primordium in the case of secondary roots.

=== Intercalary meristem ===
In angiosperms, intercalary (sometimes called basal) meristems occur in monocot (in particular, grass) stems at the base of nodes and leaf blades. Horsetails and Welwitschia also exhibit intercalary growth. Intercalary meristems are capable of cell division, and they allow for rapid growth and regrowth of many monocots. Intercalary meristems at the nodes of bamboo allow for rapid stem elongation, while those at the base of most grass leaf blades allow damaged leaves to rapidly regrow. This leaf regrowth in grasses evolved in response to damage by grazing herbivores and/or wildfires.

=== Floral meristem ===
When plants begin flowering, the shoot apical meristem is transformed into an inflorescence meristem, which goes on to produce the floral meristem, which produces the sepals, petals, stamens, and carpels of the flower.

In contrast to vegetative apical meristems and some efflorescence meristems, floral meristems cannot continue to grow indefinitely. Their growth is limited to the flower with a particular size and form. The transition from shoot meristem to floral meristem requires floral meristem identity genes, that both specify the floral organs and cause the termination of the production of stem cells. AGAMOUS (AG) is a floral homeotic gene required for floral meristem termination and necessary for proper development of the stamens and carpels. AG is necessary to prevent the conversion of floral meristems to inflorescence shoot meristems, but is identity gene LEAFY (LFY) and WUS and is restricted to the centre of the floral meristem or the inner two whorls. This way floral identity and region specificity is achieved. WUS activates AG by binding to a consensus sequence in the AG's second intron and LFY binds to adjacent recognition sites. Once AG is activated it represses expression of WUS leading to the termination of the meristem.

Through the years, scientists have manipulated floral meristems for economic reasons. An example is the mutant tobacco plant "Maryland Mammoth". In 1936, the department of agriculture of Switzerland performed several scientific tests with this plant. "Maryland Mammoth" is peculiar in that it grows much faster than other tobacco plants.

=== Apical dominance ===
Apical dominance is where one meristem prevents or inhibits the growth of other meristems. As a result, the plant will have one clearly defined main trunk. For example, in trees, the tip of the main trunk bears the dominant shoot meristem. Therefore, the tip of the trunk grows rapidly and is not shadowed by branches. If the dominant meristem is cut off, one or more branch tips will assume dominance. The branch will start growing faster and the new growth will be vertical. Over the years, the branch may begin to look more and more like an extension of the main trunk. Often several branches will exhibit this behavior after the removal of apical meristem, leading to a bushy growth.

The mechanism of apical dominance is based on auxins, types of plant growth regulators. These are produced in the apical meristem and transported towards the roots in the cambium. If apical dominance is complete, they prevent any branches from forming as long as the apical meristem is active. If the dominance is incomplete, side branches will develop.

Recent investigations into apical dominance and the control of branching have revealed a new plant hormone family termed strigolactones. These compounds were previously known to be involved in seed germination and communication with mycorrhizal fungi and are now shown to be involved in inhibition of branching.

=== Diversity in meristem architectures ===
The SAM contains a population of stem cells that also produce the lateral meristems while the stem elongates. It turns out that the mechanism of regulation of the stem cell number might be evolutionarily conserved. The CLAVATA gene CLV2 responsible for maintaining the stem cell population in Arabidopsis thaliana is very closely related to the maize gene FASCIATED EAR 2(FEA2) also involved in the same function. Similarly, in rice, the FON1-FON2 system seems to bear a close relationship with the CLV signaling system in Arabidopsis thaliana. These studies suggest that the regulation of stem cell number, identity and differentiation might be an evolutionarily conserved mechanism in monocots, if not in angiosperms. Rice also contains another genetic system distinct from FON1-FON2, that is involved in regulating stem cell number. This example underlines the innovation that goes about in the living world all the time.

=== Role of the KNOX-family genes ===
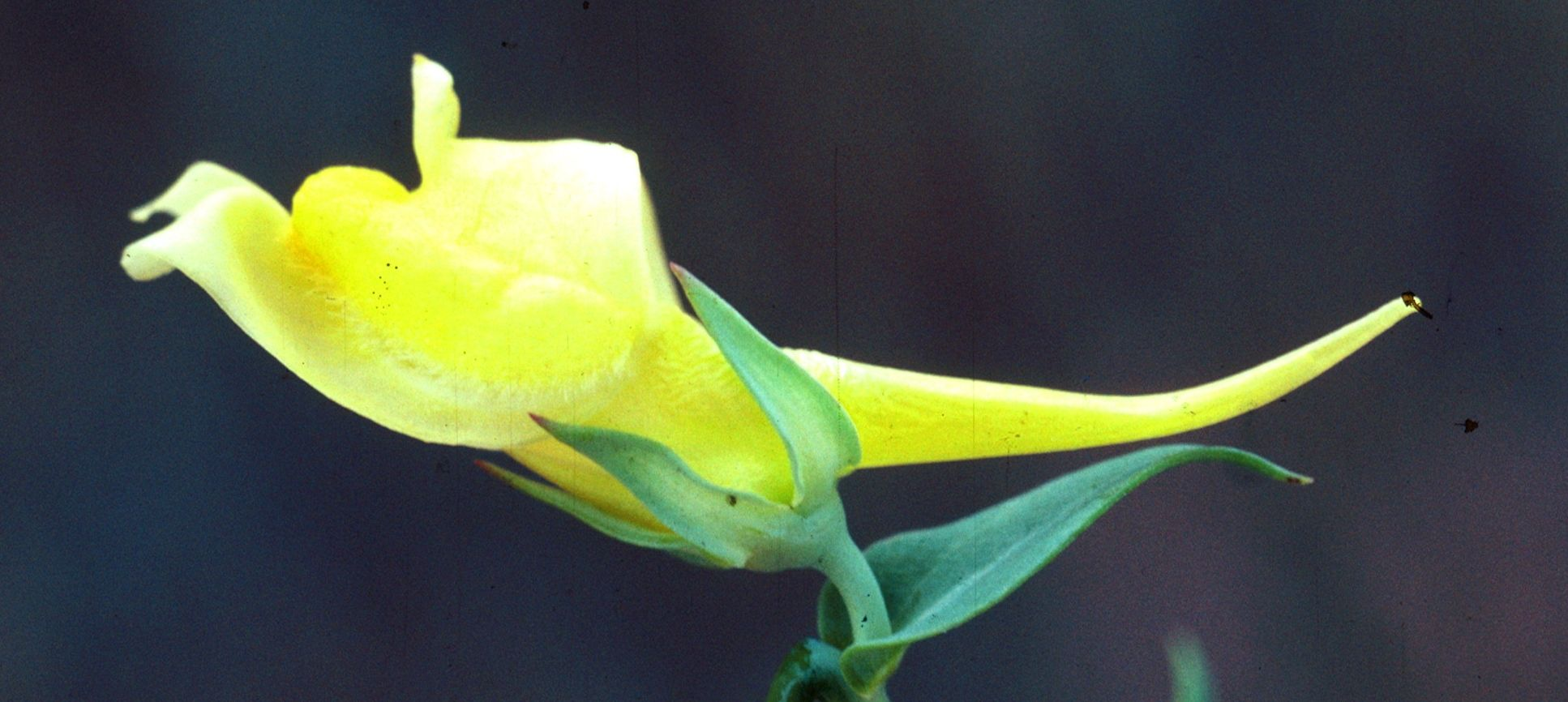
Note the long spur of the above flower. Spurs attract pollinators and confer pollinator specificity. (Flower: Linaria dalmatica)

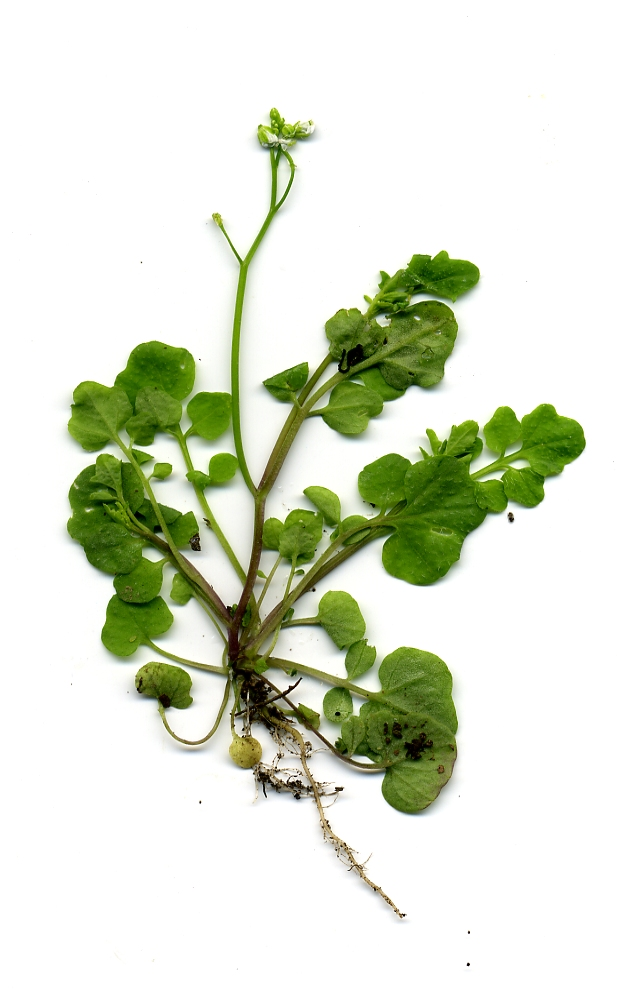
Complex leaves of Cardamine hirsuta result from KNOX gene expression

Genetic screens have identified genes belonging to the KNOX family in this function. These genes essentially maintain the stem cells in an undifferentiated state. The KNOX family has undergone quite a bit of evolutionary diversification while keeping the overall mechanism more or less similar. Members of the KNOX family have been found in plants as diverse as Arabidopsis thaliana, rice, barley and tomato. KNOX-like genes are also present in some algae, mosses, ferns and gymnosperms. Misexpression of these genes leads to the formation of interesting morphological features. For example, among members of Antirrhineae, only the species of the genus Antirrhinum lack a structure called spur in the floral region. A spur is considered an evolutionary innovation because it defines pollinator specificity and attraction. Researchers carried out transposon mutagenesis in Antirrhinum majus, and saw that some insertions led to formation of spurs that were very similar to the other members of Antirrhineae, indicating that the loss of spur in wild Antirrhinum majus populations could probably be an evolutionary innovation.

The KNOX family has also been implicated in leaf shape evolution (See below for a more detailed discussion). One study looked at the pattern of KNOX gene expression in A. thaliana, that has simple leaves and Cardamine hirsuta, a plant having complex leaves. In A. thaliana, the KNOX genes are completely turned off in leaves, but in C.hirsuta, the expression continued, generating complex leaves. Also, it has been proposed that the mechanism of KNOX gene action is conserved across all vascular plants, because there is a tight correlation between KNOX expression and a complex leaf morphology.

== Indeterminate growth of meristems ==
Though each plant grows according to a certain set of rules, each new root and shoot meristem can go on growing for as long as it is alive. In many plants, meristematic growth is potentially indeterminate, making the overall shape of the plant not determinate in advance. This is the primary growth. Primary growth leads to lengthening of the plant body and organ formation. All plant organs arise ultimately from cell divisions in the apical meristems, followed by cell expansion and differentiation. Primary growth gives rise to the apical part of many plants.

The growth of nitrogen-fixing root nodules on legume plants such as soybean and pea is either determinate or indeterminate. Thus, soybean (or bean and Lotus japonicus) produce determinate nodules (spherical), with a branched vascular system surrounding the central infected zone. Often, Rhizobium-infected cells have only small vacuoles. In contrast, nodules on pea, clovers, and Medicago truncatula are indeterminate, to maintain (at least for some time) an active meristem that yields new cells for Rhizobium infection. Thus zones of maturity exist in the nodule. Infected cells usually possess a large vacuole. The plant vascular system is branched and peripheral.

== Cloning ==
Under appropriate conditions, each shoot meristem can develop into a complete, new plant or clone. Such new plants can be grown from shoot cuttings that contain an apical meristem. Root apical meristems are not readily cloned, however. This cloning is called asexual reproduction or vegetative reproduction and is widely practiced in horticulture to mass-produce plants of a desirable genotype. This process known as mericloning, has been shown to reduce or eliminate viruses present in the parent plant in multiple species of plants.

Propagating through cuttings is another form of vegetative propagation that initiates root or shoot production from secondary meristematic cambial cells. This explains why basal 'wounding' of shoot-borne cuttings often aids root formation.

== Induced meristems ==
Meristems may also be induced in the roots of legumes such as soybean, Lotus japonicus, pea, and Medicago truncatula after infection with soil bacteria commonly called Rhizobia. Cells of the inner or outer cortex in the so-called "window of nodulation" just behind the developing root tip are induced to divide. The critical signal substance is the lipo-oligosaccharide Nod factor, decorated with side groups to allow specificity of interaction. The Nod factor receptor proteins NFR1 and NFR5 were cloned from several legumes including Lotus japonicus, Medicago truncatula and soybean (Glycine max). Regulation of nodule meristems utilizes long-distance regulation known as the autoregulation of nodulation (AON). This process involves a leaf-vascular tissue located LRR receptor kinases (LjHAR1, GmNARK and MtSUNN), CLE peptide signalling, and KAPP interaction, similar to that seen in the CLV1,2,3 system. LjKLAVIER also exhibits a nodule regulation phenotype though it is not yet known how this relates to the other AON receptor kinases.

== Lateral meristems ==
Lateral meristems, the form of secondary plant growth, add growth to the plants in their diameter. This is primarily observed in perennial dicots that survive from year to year. There are two types of lateral meristems: vascular cambium and cork cambium.

In vascular cambium, the primary phloem and xylem are produced by the apical meristem. After this initial development, secondary phloem and xylem are produced by the lateral meristem. The two are connected through a thin layer of parenchymal cells which are differentiated into the fascicular cambium. The fascicular cambium divides to create the new secondary phloem and xylem. Following this the cortical parenchyma between vascular cylinders differentiates interfascicular cambium. This process repeats for indeterminate growth.

Cork cambium creates a protective covering around the outside of a plant. This occurs after the secondary xylem and phloem has expanded already. Cortical parenchymal cells differentiate into cork cambium near the epidermis which lays down new cells called phelloderm and cork cells. These cork cells are impermeable to water and gases because of a substance called suberin that coats them.

== See also ==
- Primary growth
- Secondary growth
- Stem cell
- Thallus
- Tissues

== Sources ==
- Plant Anatomy Laboratory from University of Texas; the lab of JD Mauseth. Micrographs of plant cells and tissues, with explanatory text.
- Schoof, Heiko; Lenhard, M; Haecker, A; Mayer, KF; Jürgens, G; Laux, T (2000). "Arabidopsis shoot meristems is maintained by a regulatory loop between Clavata and Wuschel genes". Cell. 100 (6): 635–644. doi:10.1016/S0092-8674(00)80700-X. PMID 10761929. S2CID 8963007.
- Scofield and Murray (2006). The evolving concept of the meristem. Plant Molecular Biology 60:v–vii.
