= Strigolactone =

Group of chemical compounds

Strigolactones are a group of chemical compounds produced by roots of plants. Due to their mechanism of action, these molecules have been classified as plant hormones or phytohormones. So far, strigolactones have been identified to be responsible for three different physiological processes: First, they promote the germination of parasitic organisms that grow in the host plant's roots, such as Striga lutea and other plants of the genus Striga. Second, strigolactones are fundamental for the recognition of the plant by symbiotic fungi, especially arbuscular mycorrhizal fungi, because they establish a mutualistic association with these plants, and provide phosphate and other soil nutrients. Third, strigolactones have been identified as branching inhibition hormones in plants; when present, these compounds prevent excess bud growing in stem terminals, stopping the branching mechanism in plants.

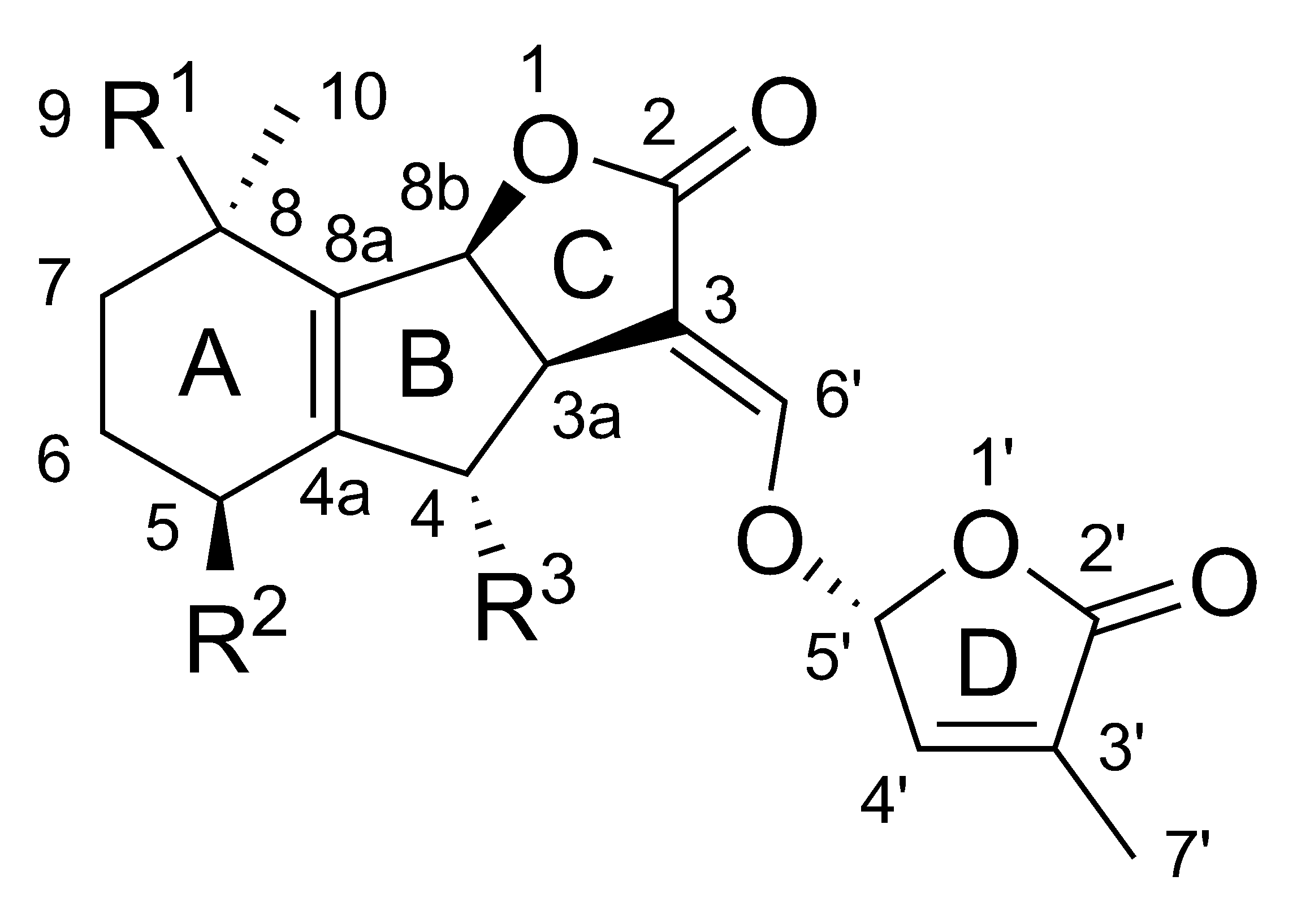
General structure of strigolactones

Strigolactones comprise a diverse group, but they all have core common chemical structure, as shown in the image to the right. The structure is based on a tricyclic lactone linked to a hydroxymethyl butenolide; the former is represented in the figure as the A-B-C part, while the latter is the D part of the molecule. Most strigolactones present variations in the ABC part, but the D ring is quite constant across the different species, which led researchers to suspect that the biological activity relies on this part of the molecule. Different studies have demonstrated that the activity of the molecules is lost when the C-D section of the molecules is modified.

Since strigolactones are involved in the signaling pathway required for germination of parasitic species (such as Striga sp.), they have been a proposed target to control pests and overgrowth of these parasitic organism. Using a molecule similar to strigolactones could be the key to designing a chemical and biological mechanism to stop the colonization of a plant's root by parasitic plants.

== Discovery and functions ==
=== Germination of parasitic plant ===
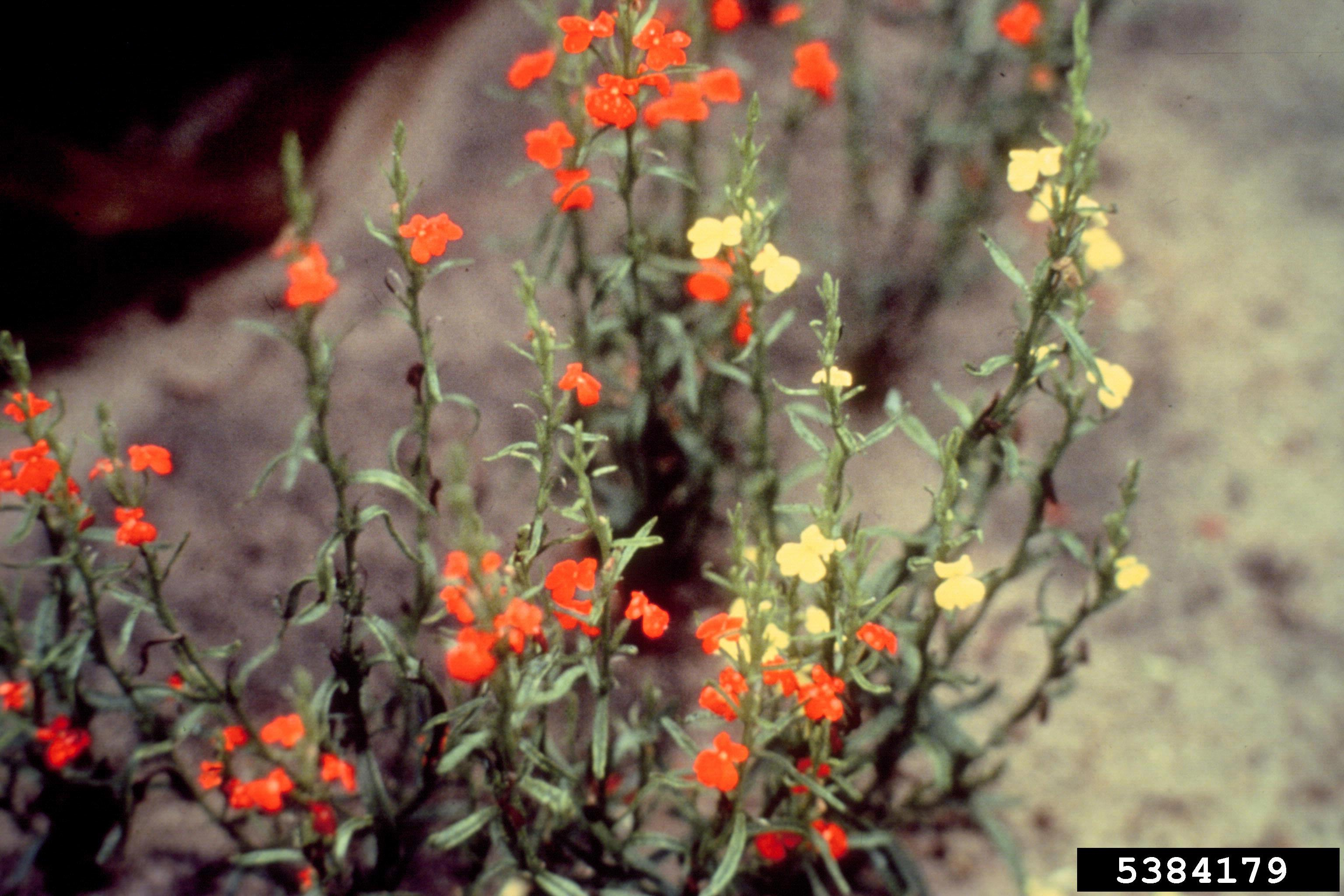
Striga asiatica (Striga lutea)

Strigolactones were first isolated in 1966 from cotton plants, specifically from the roots. However its role in germination of other organisms was not determined until later. Previous studies with Striga lutea had already shown that root extracts from the host plants were necessary for the parasitic seed to start germinating, which made obvious that a substance produced in the roots was stimulating this process. The isolation of strigolactones lead to a series of tests that proved that this compound was the necessary molecule to induce germination of Striga species. Later on, similar compounds were proven to produce the same effect: sorgolactone and alectrol, both of them presented the characteristic lactone group, so they were classified as strigolactones. To induce germination of parasitic plants, strigolactones only needed to be present in trace amounts, in the order of 5 parts per million.

=== Shoot branching hormone inhibition ===
The role of strigolactones as branching inhibitor hormone was discovered because of the use of a new set of mutant plants. These mutants presented excessive growth in the axillary buds, which induced their terminal stem to start branching abnormally. Previously, cytokinins were thought to be the only molecule involved in the regulation of stem branching, but these mutants presented normal production and signaling of cytokinins, leading to the conclusion that another substance was acting on the axillary buds. Different tests that consisted in inserting part of the mutants plants into wild specimens (and vice versa), were able to demonstrated that the mutants were either not able to recognize a signal molecule coming from the roots and the lower part of the plant, or not able to produce the require molecules to inhibit branching. This molecule, that was involved in branching regulation, was later identified to be a strigolactone. The conclusion was that, in presence of strigolactones, the plant would be prevented from overgrowing and would develop excessive branches, but when is not present, the axillary bud will start inducing abnormal branching.

== Chemistry ==
=== Properties ===
Although strigolactones vary in some of their functional groups, their melting point is usually found always between 200 and 202 degrees Celsius. The decomposition of the molecule occurs after reaching 195 °C. They are highly soluble in polar solvents, such as acetone; soluble in benzene, and almost insoluble in hexane.

=== Chemical structures ===
Some examples of strigolactones include:

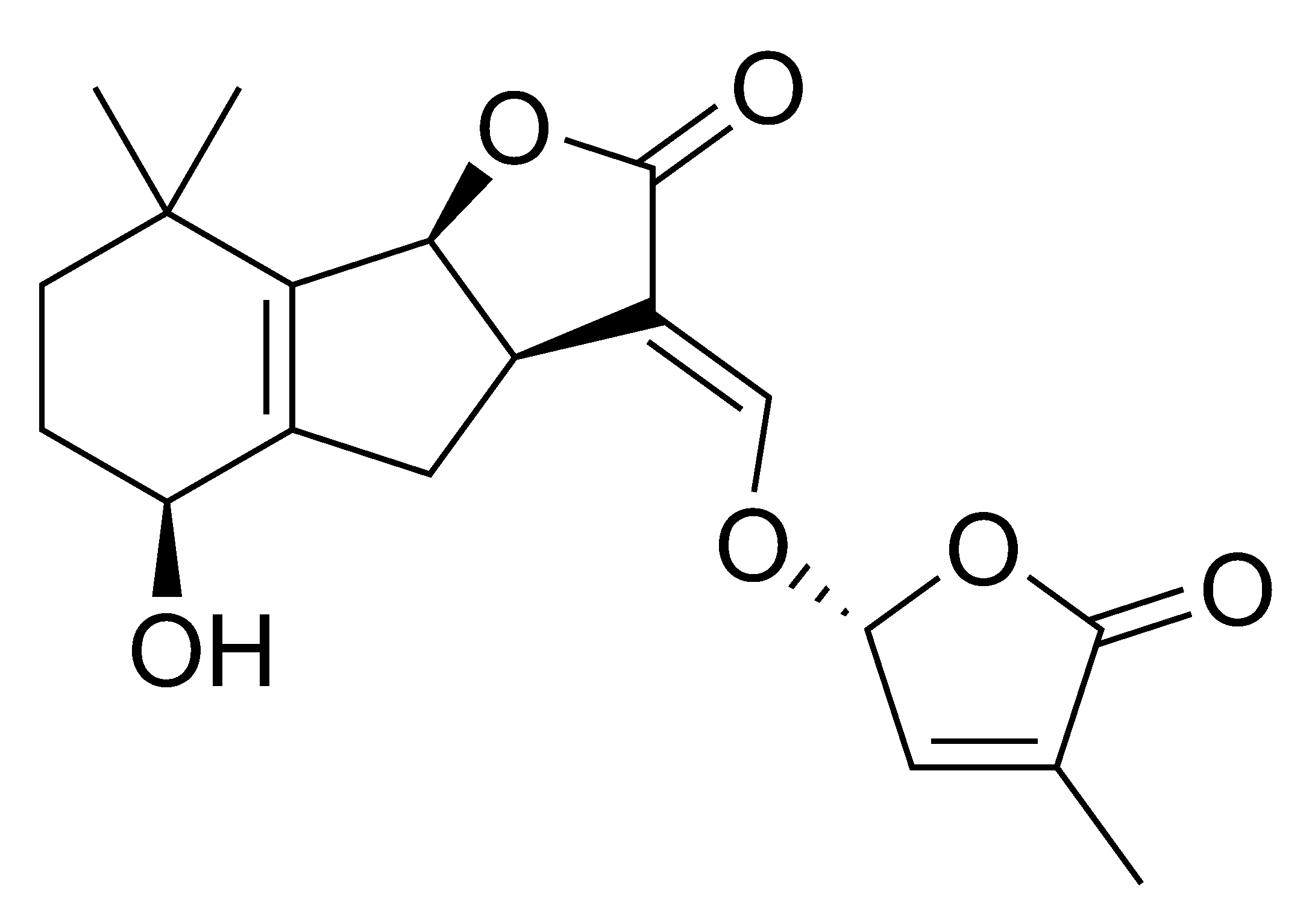
(+)-Strigol

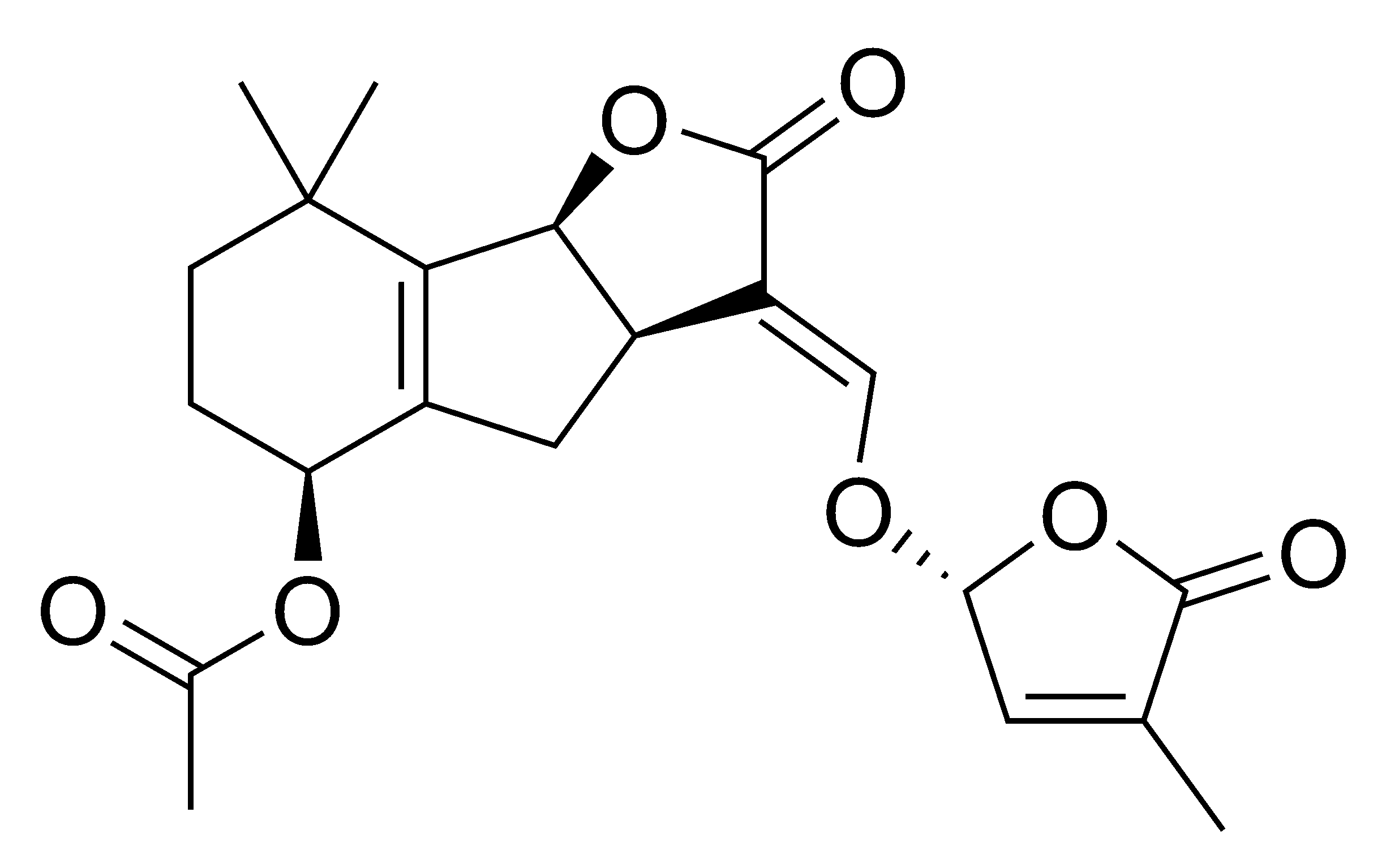
(+)-Strigyl acetate

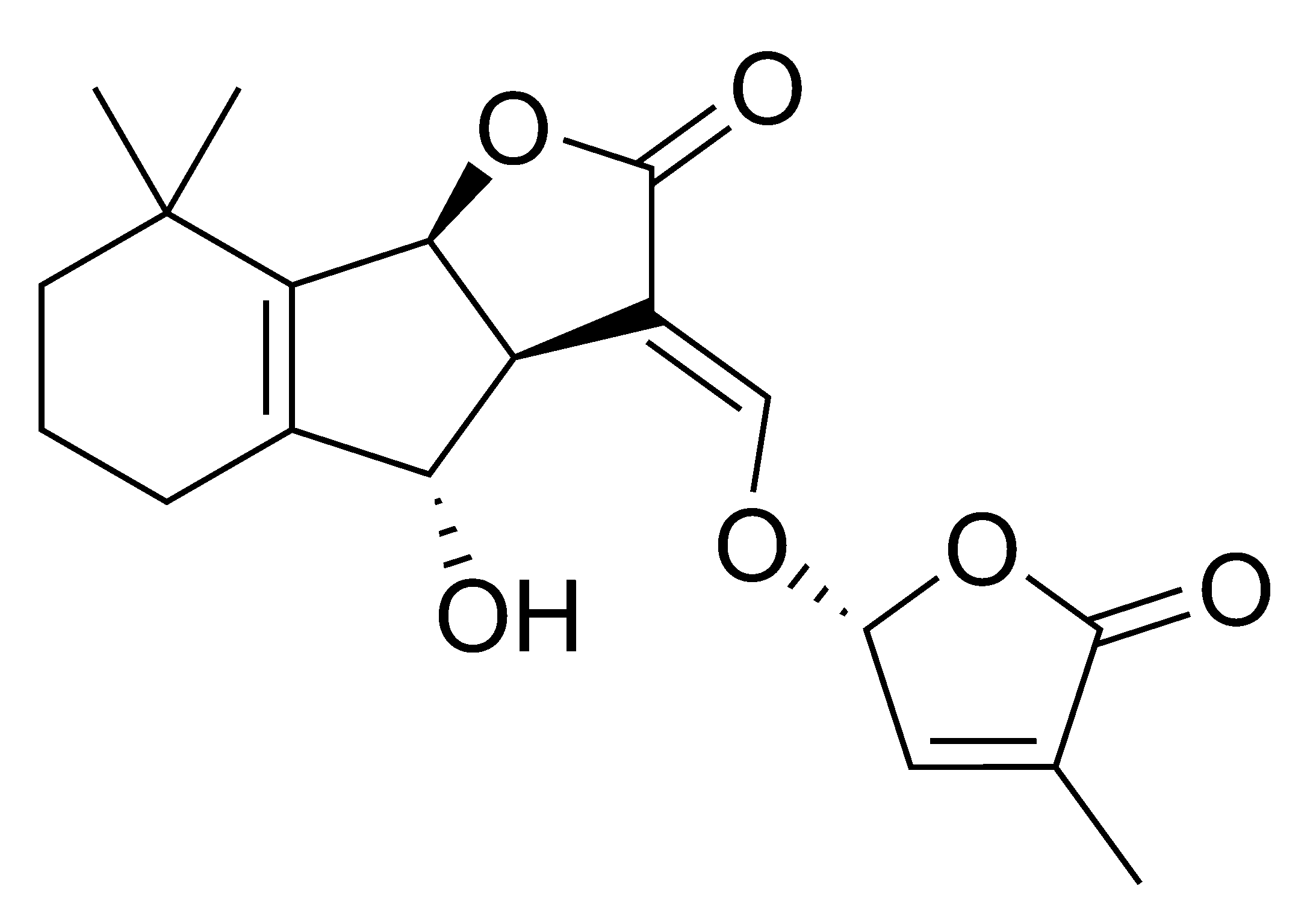
(+)-Orobanchol

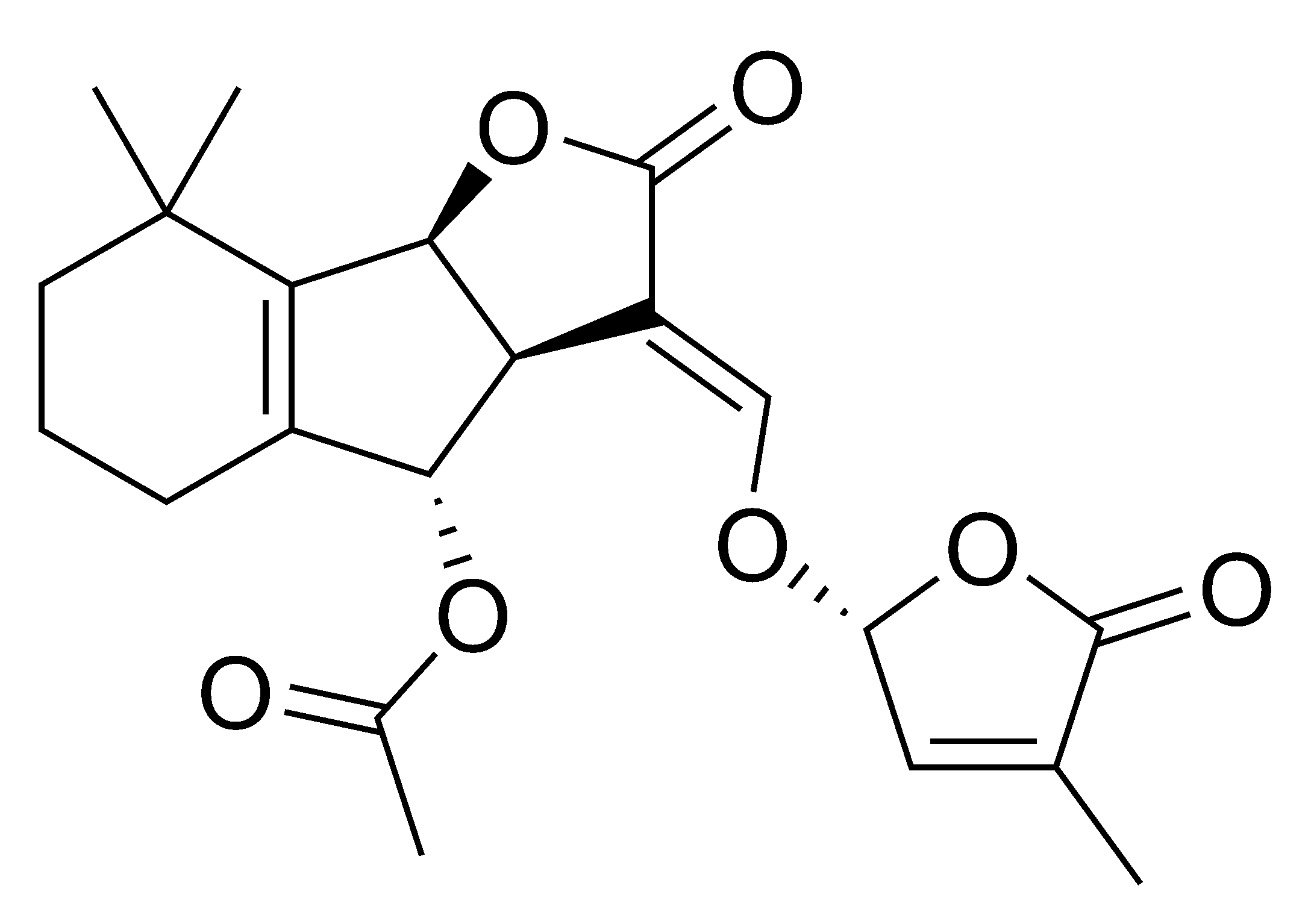
(+)-Orobanchyl acetate

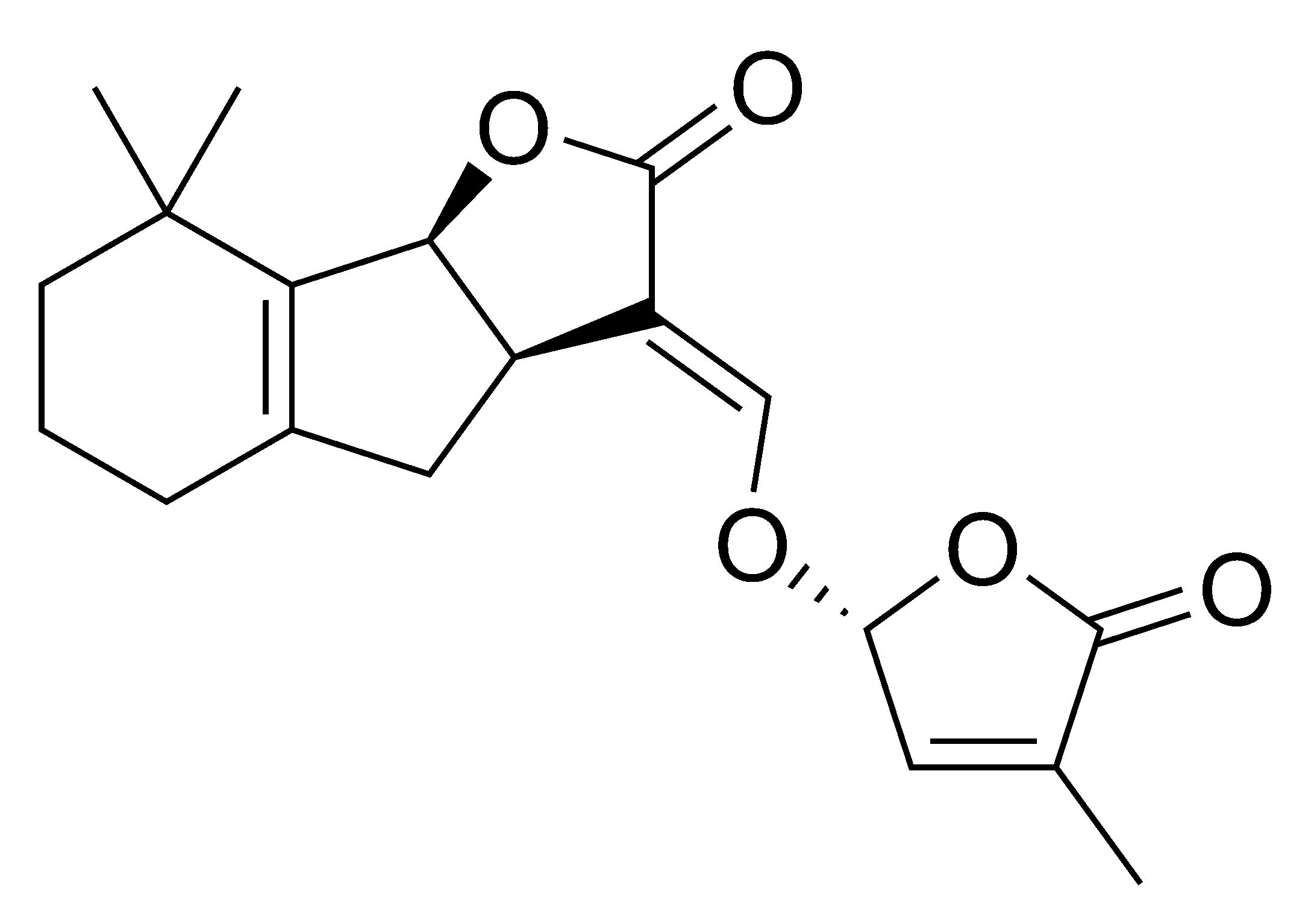
(+)-5-Deoxystrigol

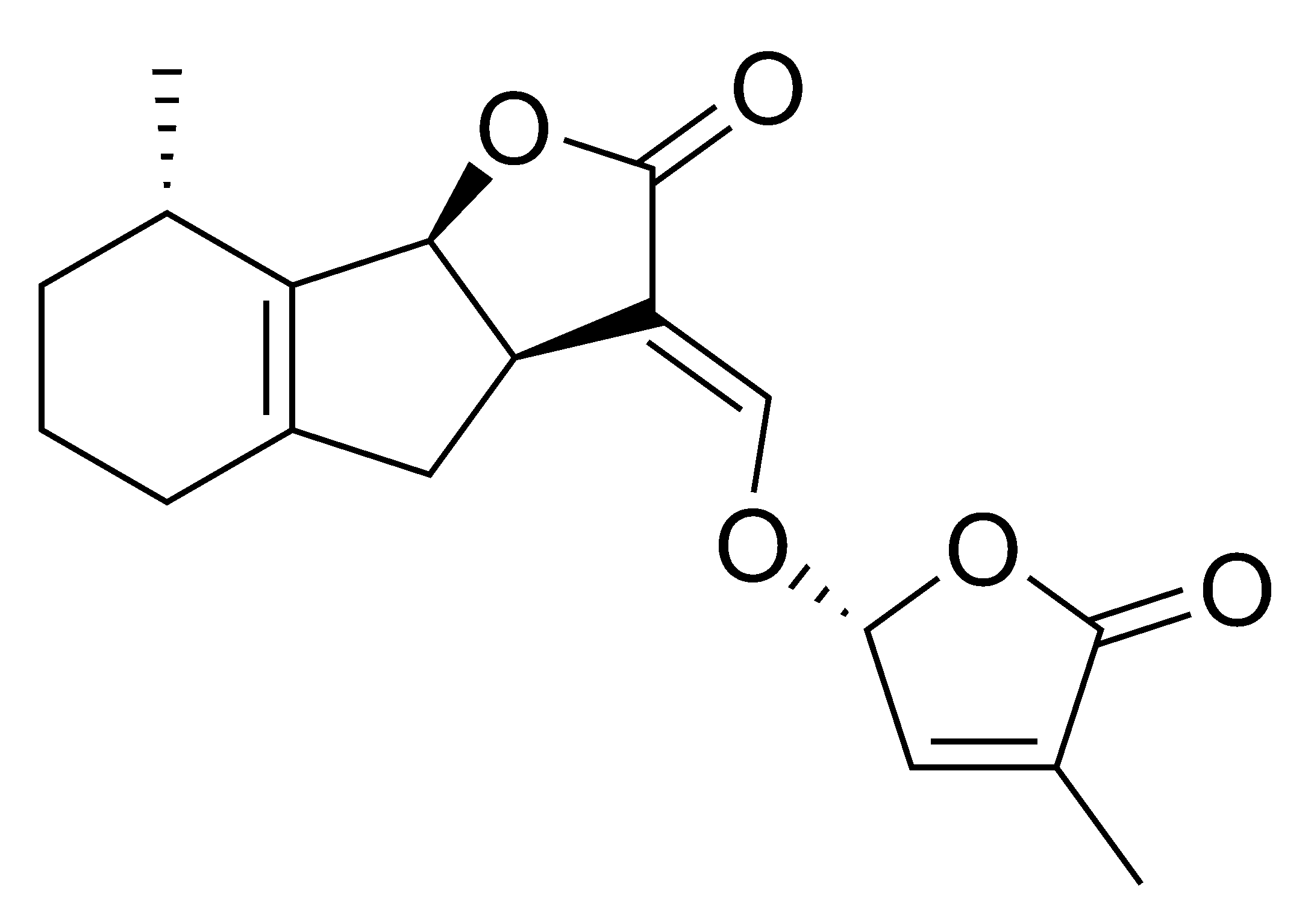
Sorgolactone

== Biosynthesis ==
=== Carotenoid pathway via carlactone ===
The biosynthetic pathway of the strigolactones has not been fully elucidated, but different steps have been identified, including the required enzymes to carry out the chemical transformation. The first step is the isomerization of the 9th chemical bond of the $\beta$-carotene, changing from trans configuration to cis. This first step is carried out by the enzyme $\beta$-carotene isomerase, also called DWARF27 or D27 for short, which required iron as a cofactor. The second step is the chemical separation of 9-cis-$\beta$-carotene into two different compounds: the first one is 9-cis-aldehyde and the second is $\beta$-ionone. This second step is catalized by the carotenoid cleavage deoxygenase 7 (CCD7). In the third step, another carotenoid cleavage oxygenase, called CCD8 (from the same family as CCD7), catalyze the conversion and rearrangement of the aldehyde created in the previous step into 9-cis-$\beta$-apo-10 and subsequently producing carlactone.

Recent research has identified two parallel strigolactone biosynthetic pathways in maize, both of which produce the major maize strigolactone, zealactone. The enzyme ZmCYP706C37 catalyzes several consecutive oxidative reactions with 3-hydroxy-MeCLA and 3-oxo-MeCLA as putative intermediates to form zealactone from MeCLA. Both 3-hydroxy-MeCLA and 3-oxo-MeCLA were successfully converted to zealactone by ZmCYP706C37. The balance between zealactone and two other strigolactones, zealactol and zealactonoic acid (ZA), can be altered by changes in flux through these pathways. This discovery has implications for breeding Striga resistance in maize by modifying the strigolactone blend, potentially reducing the devastating effects of this parasitic weed in Africa.

It is still not clear how exactly carlactone is transformed into the different strigolactones identified so far, but several studies have proved that carlactone is definitely the precursor of strigolactones. This last step of the biosynthesis should involve the addition of at least two oxygen molecules to convert the carlactone in 5-deoxystrigol, a simple strigolactone, and more oxidation should be required to produce other more complex strigolactone. The protein MAX1 has been proposed to catalyze the last step of the biosynthesis of strigolactones due its role in oxidative metabolism in plants.

=== Role of ABA in biosynthesis ===
Both, abscisic acid (ABA) and strigolactones have a common group of enzymes that carried out the synthesis of the two compounds, previously it had been demonstrated the existence of a correlation of the two biosynthesis pathways, and it has been supported by different studies. The ABA biosynthesis relies in a set of enzymes, called 9-cis-epoxycarotenoid dioxygenase (NCED). But, mutants plants that were defective in the production of the NCED enzymes, not just presented low levels of ABA, rather they also present low levels of strigolactones, specifically in the roots extracts where this hormone is mostly synthesized, this finding provided the basis for the existence of a common enzymatic machinery, Other experiments that consist in blocking the NCED enzymes and using mutants unable to detect ABA changes, were used to support this theory. So far there is a clear correlation of both synthesis that is related to the used of NCED enzymes in both biosynthesis, but the exact mechanism in which they are connected remains unclear.

== Molecular perception ==
In plants, strigolactones are perceived by the dual receptor/hydrolase protein DWARF14 (D14), a member of the α/β hydrolase superfamily. Despite being considered hydrolases with poor substrate turnover, an intact catalytic triad is required for the protein's biological function. Molecular dynamics studies have suggested that the ligand binding pocket is flexible and that the catalytic triad plays an important role for ligand binding and positioning. Several (in part competing) models have been proposed for the involvement of the catalytic triad in ligand perception:

- Hydrolysis of strigolactone, resulting in the D-ring being covalently attached to the active site serine.
- Hydrolysis of strigolactone, resulting in a free D-ring that serves as a molecular glue at the entrance of the receptor, mediating interaction with another protein.
- Binding of non-hydrolyzed, intact strigolactone that generates an altered DWARF14 protein surface, mediating interaction with another protein.
- Hydrolysis of strigolactone, resulting in the D-ring being covalently attached to the active site histidine.
- Hydrolysis of strigolactone, resulting in the D-ring being covalently attached to the active site serine and histidine at the same time, inducing a conformational change of DWARF14, leading to interaction with another protein.

Kinetic results have suggested that the intact strigolactone triggers a signaling cascade after which hydrolysis is carried out as the final step to inactivate the strigolactone molecule.

== Mechanism of action ==
=== Germination of arbuscular mycorrhiza ===
Strigolactones are known to stimulate the germination of arbuscular mycorrhiza spores. Since they produce this effect at extremely low concentrations, it has been proposed that the mechanism of activation must be a signaling pathway. Different studies with diverse type of fungi, have found that after stimulation with strigolactones, the fungal cells present a higher amount of mitochondria and an increase in their oxidative activity. Due to the role of mitochondria in oxidative metabolism of macronutrients, it is thought that the spores remain inactive before finding the host plant, and once they are stimulated with strigolactones, the oxidative machinery in the mitochondrion gets activated to produce energy and nutrients necessaries for germination of the spore and fungal branching. Studies with root extracts support this hypothesis, and so far strigolactones are the candidate molecules that better explain this increased in mitochondrial activity.

=== Auxin-mediated secondary growth ===
It has been established that secondary growth in plant is mainly regulated by the phytohormone auxin. However, the mechanism of auxin secretion is at the same time regulated by strigolactones, thus the latter can control secondary growth through auxin. When applied in terminal buds of stem, strigolactone can block the expression of transport proteins required to move auxin across the buds, these proteins are denominated PIN1. Thus, it was not surprising that when analyzing strigolactone deficient mutants, they were found to present an over-expression of PIN1 protein, which facilitate the transport of auxin in the terminal buds; auxin prevented the mitotic activity of these buds, stopping the plant to initiate secondary growth and branching. In conclusion, plants depend in auxin transport for secondary growth initiation or inhibition, but these transport mechanism is dependent of the production of strigolactones, which can easily travel from the site of production (roots) to the terminal buds of the stem through the xylem.

== Ecology ==
=== Plant-fungi interaction ===
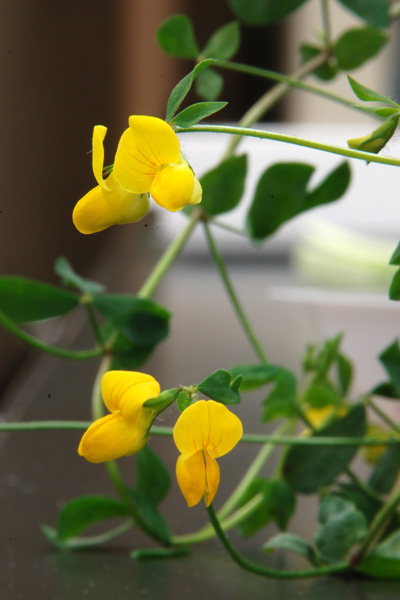
Lotus japonicus

Strigolactones play a fundamental role in plant-fungi interaction. One of the first studies made in Lotus japonicus had already demonstrated that compounds extracted from the root were necessary for the development of arbuscular mycorrhizal fungi that will establish a symbiotic relationship with the plant's root. These same findings were true for different plants such as maize and sorghum. Later on, the compounds responsible for the branching of the arbuscular fungi were isolated, and they include 5-deoxystrigol, strigol and sorgolactone, all of them belonging to the strigolactone family of compounds. The process of branching is crucial to establish the symbiosis. Since this branching only occurs after the germination of the spores and the initial growth of the hypha, the strigolactones required for germination have to be secreted by the plant and reached to fungi, meaning that strigolactones are also part of the recognition process by the fungi.

Because arbuscula mychorriza can form symbiotic associations with the majority of the angiosperms, and many gymnosperms, it is expected to found different strigolactones compounds distributed in a whole variety of plants. Unfortunately, while strigolactones are supposedly found in most plants, the studies done with strigolactones and AM fungi so far, have only studied a very limited range of plant species, mostly due to the difficulty to extract these compounds and due its ease to disintegrate in solution.

Strigolactones are not only necessary for the recognition of the plant by the fungi, they are also required by the recognition of the fungi by the plant. The mechanism of fungal recognition occurs in a similar fashion to the recognition of bacteria such as Rhizobia sp. It has been proposed that the recognition mechanism for bacteria evolved from the mechanism to recognize fungi, because the latter is known to be more primitive and ancient. Just like bacteria use Nod factors, the fungi use a set of molecules denominated Myc factor. These fungal products can be recognized by different plants and are not designed to be plant-specific. When these Myc factors are recognized by the plant's root, they stimulate the expression of different genes involved in the initiation of the symbiotic association. However, the secretion of the Myc factor by the fungi occurs only after being previously stimulated by strigolactones from the plant, demonstrating the necessary role of these compounds for both recognition (from fungi and from plant). Strigolactones also have been reported to produce other changes in fungal cells, such as an increase in the concentration of intracellular calcium and an increase in lipochitoolisaccharides (LCOs), the latter has been proved to be one of the Myc factors produced by the fungi for its recognition by the plant.

One of the main roles of arbuscular fungi contained in symbiotic association with plants is to provide soil nutrients to the plants, especially phosphate. Thus when the phosphate in the depletion zone gets really low, the plant depend mainly in the AM fungi to fulfill its phosphate demands. Studies with tomato plants have shown that, when plants undergo a deficit in phosphate, they produce higher amount of strigolactones, which in turn will increase the branching of AM fungi. This excess development of the fungi is expected to provide the additional phosphate required for the plant, since the fungi can now spread to more soil areas. However, since strigolactone also stimulate the germination of parasitic plants, these phosphate-deficient plants also present higher invasion of parasitic species such as Striga sp. Providing adequate phosphate through soil fertilization has been proved to reduce the proliferation of these parasites, because they require strigolactone for its germination.

== See also ==
- Plant hormone
- DWARF27
- Auxin
- Abscisic acid
- Arbuscular mycorrhiza
