= CCD8 =

CCD8 (gene) may refer to:

- Carlactone synthase
- All-trans-10'-apo-beta-carotenal 13,14-cleaving dioxygenase
