= MAX4 =

MAX4 (gene) may refer to:

- Carlactone synthase, an enzyme
- All-trans-10'-apo-beta-carotenal 13,14-cleaving dioxygenase, an enzyme
