= SPVN06 =

Experimental gene therapy

SPVN06 is an experimental gene therapy for rod-cone dystrophy developed by SparingVision.
