= Nod factor =

Signaling molecule

The structure of the major Nod factor produced by Sinorhizobium meliloti.

Nod factors (nodulation factors or NF), are signaling molecules produced by soil bacteria known as rhizobia in response to flavonoid exudation from plants under nitrogen limited conditions. Nod factors initiate the establishment of a symbiotic relationship between legumes and rhizobia by inducing nodulation. Nod factors produce the differentiation of plant tissue in root hairs into nodules where the bacteria reside and are able to fix nitrogen from the atmosphere for the plant in exchange for photosynthates and the appropriate environment for nitrogen fixation. One of the most important features provided by the plant in this symbiosis is the production of leghemoglobin, which maintains the oxygen concentration low and prevents the inhibition of nitrogenase activity.

== Chemical Structure ==
Nod factors structurally are lipochitooligosaccharides (LCOs) that consist of an N-acetyl-D-glucosamine chain linked through β-1,4 linkage with a fatty acid of variable identity attached to a non reducing nitrogen in the backbone with various functional group substitutions at the terminal or non-terminal residues.

Nod factors are produced in complex mixtures differing in the following characteristics:

- Length of the chain can vary from three to six units of N-acetyl-D-glucosamine with the exception of M. loti which can produce Nod factors with two unit only.
- Presence or absence of strain-specific substitutions along the chain
- Identity of the fatty acid component
- Presence or absence of unsaturated fatty acids

Nod gene expression is induced by the presence of certain flavonoids in the soil, which are secreted by the plant and act as an attractant to bacteria and induce Nod factor production. Flavonoids activate NodD, a LysR family transcription factor, which binds to the nod box and initiates the transcription of the nod genes which encode the proteins necessary for the production of a wide range of LCOs.

== Function ==
Nod factors are potentially recognized by plant receptors made of two histidine kinases with extracellular LysM domain, which have been identified in L. japonicus, soybean, and M. truncatula . Binding of Nod factors to these receptors depolarizes the plasma membrane of root hairs via an influx of Ca^{+2} which induce the expression of early nodulin (ENOD) genes and swelling of the root hairs. In M. truncatula, the signal transduction initiates by the activation of dmi1, dmi2, and dmi3 which lead to the deformation of root hairs, early nodulin expression, cortical cell division and bacterial infection. Additionally, nsp and hcl genes are recruited later and aid in the process of early nodulation expression, cortical cell division, and infection. Genes dmi1, dmi2, and dmi3 have also been found to aid in the establishment of interactions between M. truncatula and arbuscular mycorrhiza, indicating that the two very different symbioses may share some common mechanisms. The end result is the nodule, the structure in which nitrogen is fixed. Nod factors act by inducing changes in gene expression in the legume, most notable the nodulin genes, which are needed for nodule organogenesis.

== Nodulation ==
Rhizobia bind to host specific lectins present in root hairs which together with Nod factors lead to the formation of nodulation. Nod factors are recognized by a specific class of receptor kinases that have LysM domains in their extracellular domains. The two LysM (lysin motif) receptor kinases (NFR1 and NFR5) that appear to make up the Nod factor receptor were first isolated in the model legume Lotus japonicus in 2003. They now have been isolated also from soybean and the model legume Medicago truncatula. NFR5 lacks the classical activation loop in the kinase domain. The NFR5 gene lacks introns. First the cell membrane is depolarized and the root hairs start to swell and cell division stops. Nod factor cause the fragmentation and rearrangement of actin network, which coupled with the reinstitution of cell growth lead to the curling of the root hair around the bacteria. This is followed by the localized breakdown of the cell wall and the invagination of the plant cell membrane, allowing the bacterium to form an infection thread. As the infection thread grows the rhizobia travel down its length towards the site of the nodule. During this process the pericycle cells in plants become activated and cells in the inner cortex start growing and become the nodule primordium where the rhizobia infect and differentiate into bacteroids and fix nitrogen. Activation of adjacent middle cortex cells leads to the formation of nodule meristem.

== See also ==
- ENOD40
