= Cone dystrophy =

Degeneration of cone cells in the eye

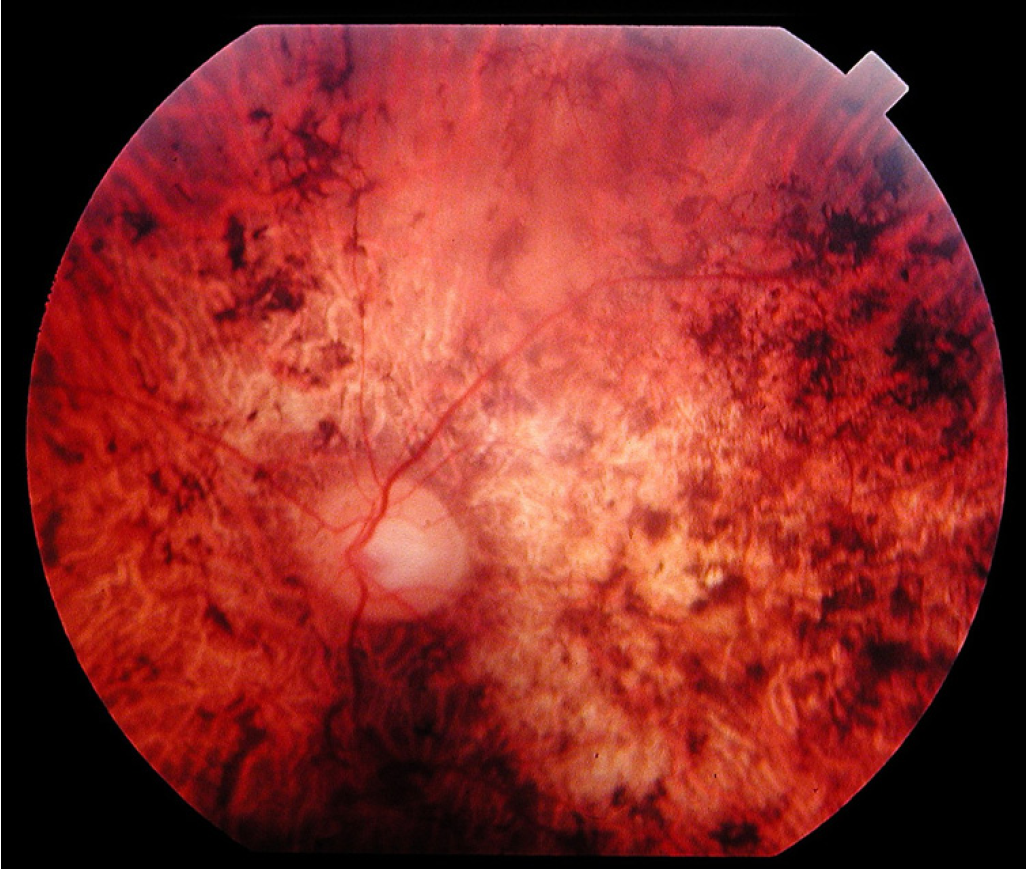
- Fundus of a 45 year-old patient with cone rod dystrophy segregating with a loss-of-function mutation (E1087X) in ABCA4. Note the presence of various-shaped pigment deposits in the posterior pole with atrophy of the retina, while the retina appears less damaged in periphery (upper part of the photograph).
- Specialty: Ophthalmology

A cone dystrophy is an inherited ocular disorder characterized by the loss of cone cells, the photoreceptors responsible for both central and color vision.

== Presentation ==
The most common symptoms of cone dystrophy are vision loss (age of onset ranging from the late teens to the sixties), sensitivity to bright lights, and poor color vision. Therefore, patients see better at dusk. Visual acuity usually deteriorates gradually, but it can deteriorate rapidly to 20/200; later, in more severe cases, it drops to "counting fingers" vision. Color vision testing using color test plates (HRR series) reveals many errors on both red-green and blue-yellow plates.

== Dystrophy of the rods and cones ==
Dystrophy of the light-sensing cells of the eye may also occur in the rods as well, or in both the cones and the rods.

A type of rod-cone dystrophy—where rod function decline is typically earlier or more pronounced than cone dystrophy—has been identified as a relatively common characteristic of Bardet–Biedl Syndrome.

At least one type of autosomal dominant cone-rod dystrophy is caused by mutations in the guanylate cyclase 2D (not geometrical) gene (GUCY2D) on chromosome 17. There is a difference between the much more prevalent syndrome Cone-Rod Dystrophy and the extremely rare Cone Dystrophy.

== Mechanism ==
The pathogenesis of cone dystrophy has yet to be elucidated. It appears that the dystrophy is primary, since subjective and objective abnormalities of cone function are found before ophthalmoscopic changes can be seen. However, the retinal pigment epithelium (RPE) rapidly becomes involved, leading to a retinal dystrophy primarily involving the macula. The histological examination of the eyes of one such patient showed that the outer nuclear layer of cones and rods had disappeared completely, whereas the RPE showed pronounced pigment changes. There was also atrophy of the temporal disc.

== Diagnosis ==
The fundus exam via ophthalmoscopy is essentially normal early on in cone dystrophy, and definite macular changes usually occur well after visual loss. Fluorescein angiography (FA) is a useful adjunct in the workup of someone suspected to have cone dystrophy, as it may detect early changes in the retina that are too subtle to be seen by ophthalmoscope. For example, FA may reveal areas of hyperfluorescence, indicating that the RPE has lost some of its integrity, allowing the underlying fluorescence from the choroid to be more visible. These early changes are usually not detected during the ophthalmoscopic exam.

The most common type of macular lesion seen during ophthalmoscopic examination has a bull's-eye appearance and consists of a doughnut-like zone of atrophic pigment epithelium surrounding a central darker area. In another, less frequent form of cone dystrophy there is rather diffuse atrophy of the posterior pole with spotty pigment clumping in the macular area. Rarely, atrophy of the choriocapillaris and larger choroidal vessels is seen in patients at an early stage. The inclusion of fluorescein angiography in the workup of these patients is important since it can help detect many of these characteristic ophthalmoscopic features. In addition to the retinal findings, temporal pallor of the optic disc is commonly observed. As expected, visual field testing in cone dystrophy usually reveals a central scotoma. In cases with the typical bull's-eye appearance, there is often relative central sparing.

Because of the wide spectrum of fundus changes and the difficulty in making the diagnosis in the early stages, electroretinography (ERG) remains the best test for making the diagnosis. Abnormal cone function on the ERG is indicated by a reduced single-flash and flicker response when the test is carried out in a well-lit room (photopic ERG). The relative sparing of rod function in cone dystrophy is evidenced by a normal scotopic ERG, i.e. when the test is carried out in the dark. In more severe or longer standing cases, the dystrophy involves a greater proportion of rods with resultant subnormal scotopic records. Since cone dystrophy is hereditary and can be asymptomatic early on in the disease process, ERG is an invaluable tool in the early diagnosis of patients with positive family histories. Cone dystrophy in general usually occurs sporadically. Hereditary forms are usually autosomal dominant, and instances of autosomal recessive and X-linked inheritance also occur.

In the differential diagnosis, other macular dystrophies as well as the hereditary optic atrophies must be considered. Fluorescent angiography, ERG, and color vision tests are important tools to help facilitate diagnosis in early stages.

== Treatment ==
Though there is no treatment for cone dystrophy, certain supplements may help in delaying the progression of the disease.

The beta-carotenoids, lutein and zeaxanthin, have been evidenced to reduce the risk of developing age-related macular degeneration (AMD), and may therefore provide similar benefits to people with cone dystrophy.

Consuming omega-3 fatty acids (docosahexaenoic acid and eicosapentaenoic acid) has been correlated with a reduced progression of early AMD, and in conjunction with low glycemic index foods, with reduced progression of advanced AMD, and may therefore delay the progression of cone dystrophy.

9-cis-beta-carotene, a version of β-carotene extracted from the marine algae Dunaliella salina was shown to be absorbed by some of the patients, allowing their vision to improve in several areas – specifically night vision, field of vision and electrical activity in the retina.
