= Calcium encoding =

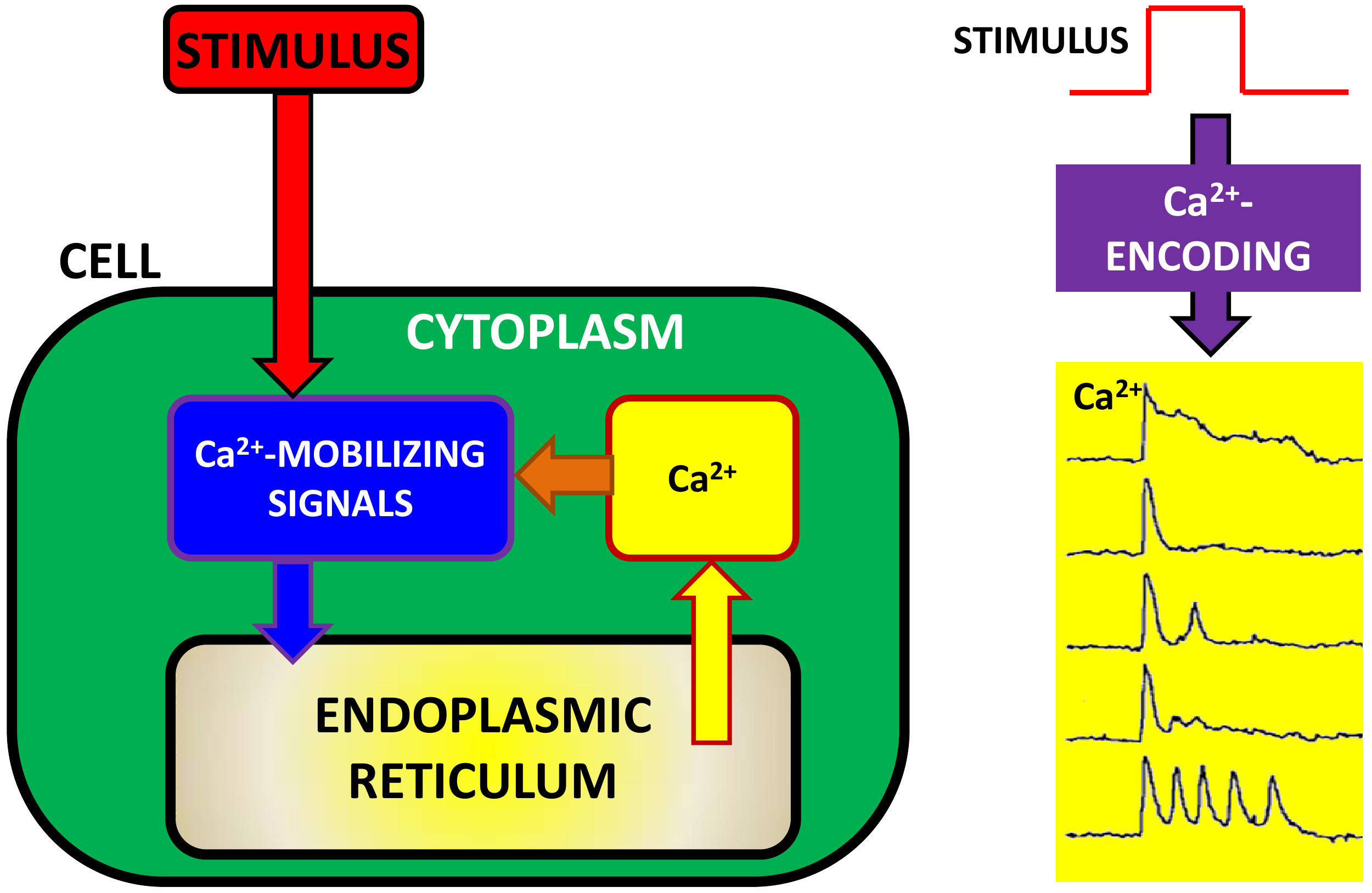
Principle of calcium encoding. A schematics of intracellular calcium signaling and its equivalent from a calcium encoding perspective.

Calcium encoding (also referred to as Ca^{2+} encoding or calcium information processing) is an intracellular signaling pathway used by many cells to transfer, process and encode external information detected by the cell. In cell physiology, external information is often converted into intracellular calcium dynamics. The concept of calcium encoding explains how Ca^{2+} ions act as intracellular messengers, relaying information within cells to regulate their activity. Given the ubiquity of Ca^{2+} ions in cell physiology, Ca^{2+} encoding has also been suggested as a potential tool to characterize cell physiology in health and disease. The mathematical bases of Ca^{2+} encoding have been pioneered by work of Joel Keizer and Hans G. Othmer on calcium modeling in the 1990s and more recently they have been revisited by Eshel Ben-Jacob, Herbert Levine and co-workers.

== AM, FM and AFM calcium encoding ==
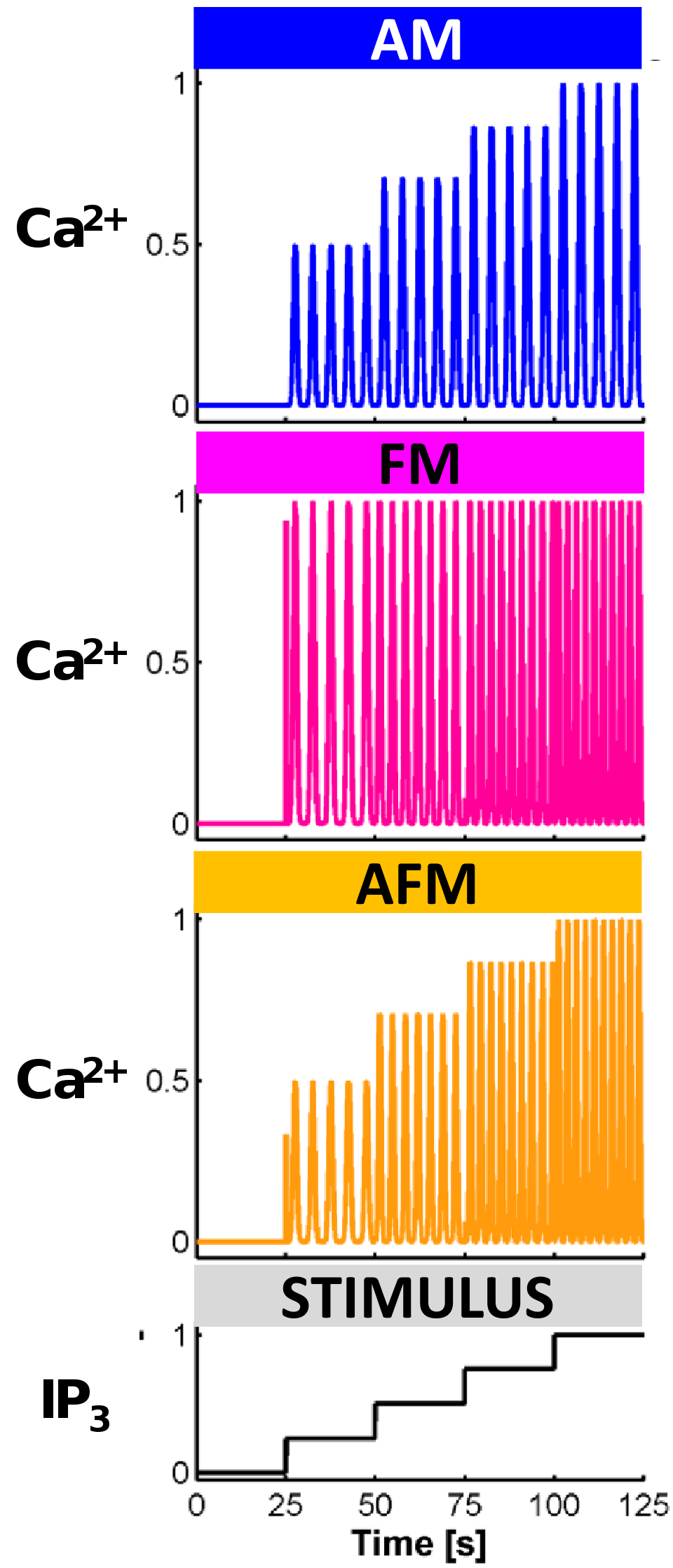
Elementary modes of calcium encoding. AM, FM and AFM encoding Ca^{2+} oscillations correspond to analogous modulations in electronic communications.

Although elevations of Ca^{2+} are necessary for it to act as a signal, prolonged increases of the concentration of Ca^{2+} in the cytoplasm can be lethal for the cell. Thus cells avoid death usually delivering Ca^{2+} signals as brief transients - i.e. Ca^{2+} elevations followed by a rapid decay - or in the form of oscillations. In analogy with Information Theory, either the amplitude or the frequency or both features of these Ca2+ oscillations define the Ca^{2+} encoding mode. Therefore, three classes of Ca^{2+} signals can be distinguished on the basis of their encoding mode:

  - AM encoding Ca^{2+} signals: when the strength of the stimuli is encoded by amplitude modulations of Ca^{2+} oscillations. In other words, stimuli of the same nature but of different strength are associated with different amplitudes of Ca^{2+} oscillations but the frequencies of these oscillations are similar;
  - FM encoding Ca^{2+} signals: when the strength of the stimuli is encoded by frequency modulations of Ca^{2+} oscillations. In other words, stimuli of the same nature but of different strength are associated with different frequencies of Ca^{2+} oscillations but the amplitudes of these oscillations are similar;
  - AFM encoding Ca^{2+} signals: when both AM and FM encoding modes coexist.

Experiments and biophysical modeling, show that the mode of calcium encoding varies from cell to cell, and that a given cell could even show different types of calcium encoding for different patho-physiological conditions. This could ultimately provide a crucial tool in medical diagnostics, to characterize, recognize and prevent diseases. Analysis tools based on Fourier transform have been developed that can perform spectral analysis and examine calcium oscillations from experimental data

== Mathematical aspects of calcium encoding ==
Calcium encoding can be mathematically characterized by biophysical models of calcium signaling. Phase plane and bifurcation analysis of these models, can reveal in fact how frequency and amplitude of calcium oscillations vary as a function of any parameter of the model. Occurrence of AM-, FM- or AFM-encoding can be assessed on the extension of the min-max range of amplitude and frequency of Ca^{2+} oscillations and the bifurcation structure of the system under study.

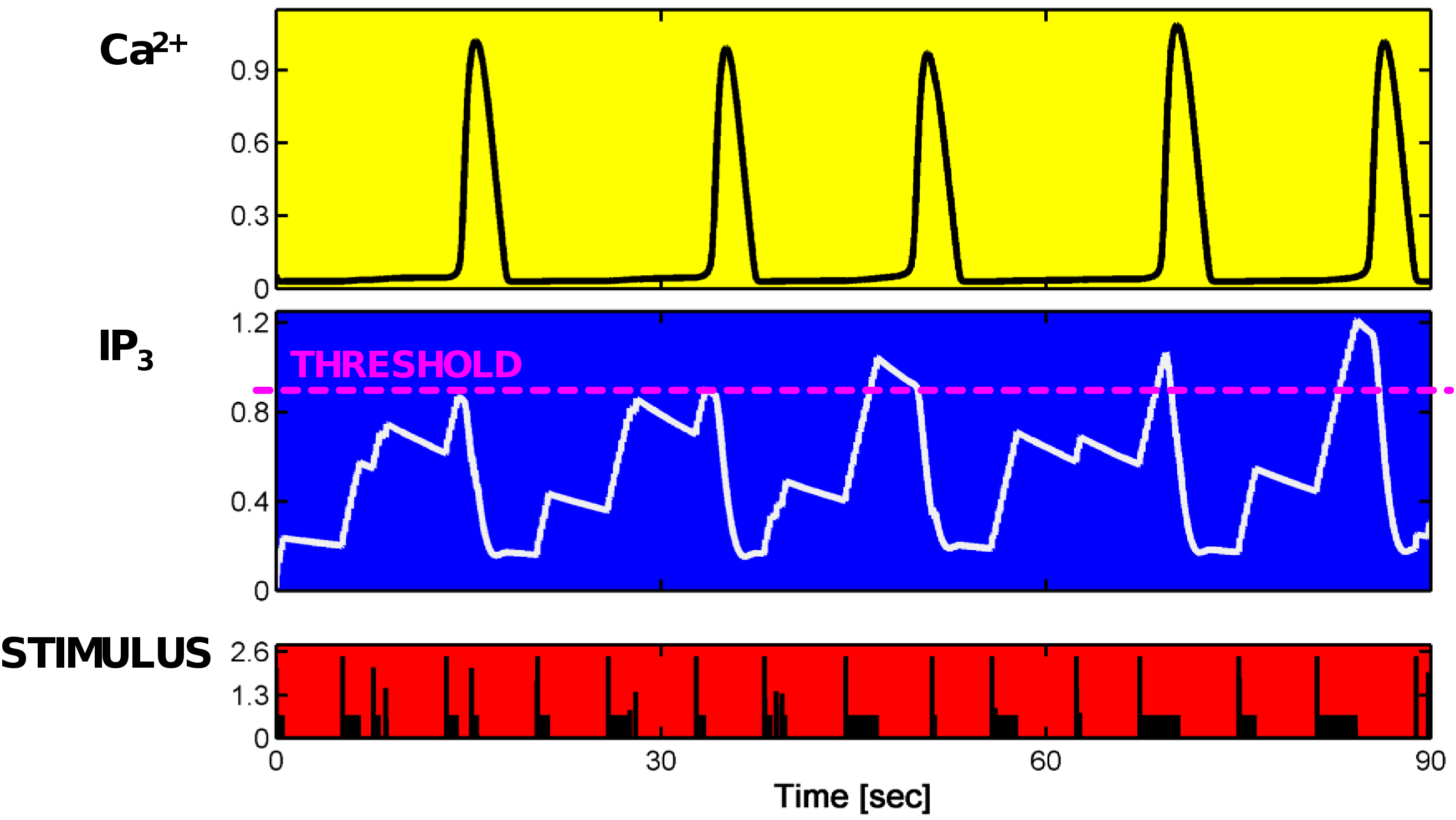
Stimulus integration. Only if the stimulus allows accumulation (i.e. integration) of IP_{3} up to a certain threshold then an FM-encoding Ca^{2+} oscillation occurs.

A critical aspect of Ca^{2+} encoding revealed by modeling, is how it depends on the dynamics of the complex network of reactions of underlying Ca^{2+}-mobilizing signals. This aspect can be addressed considering Ca^{2+} models that include both Ca^{2+} dynamics and the dynamics of Ca^{2+}-mobilizing signals. One simple and biophysically realistic model of this kind is the ChI model, originally developed by Eshel Ben-Jacob and co-workers, for GPCR-mediated inositol-1,4,5-trisphosphate (IP_{3})-triggered Ca^{2+}-induced Ca^{2+}-release. The main conclusion of this study was that the dynamics of the Ca^{2+}-mobilizing IP_{3} signal is essentially AFM encoding with respect to the stimulus whereas Ca^{2+} oscillations can be either FM or AFM but not solely AM. It was argued that the AFM nature of the Ca^{2+}-mobilizing IP_{3} signal could represent the ideal solution to optimally translate pulsed or discontinuous extracellular signals into intracellular continuous-like Ca^{2+} oscillations.

== Computational aspects ==
Calcium encoding can be confined within a single cell or involve cell ensembles and deploy essential computational tasks, such as stimulus integration or regulated activation of gene transcription. Moreover, cells are often organized in networks, allowing intercellular propagation of calcium signaling. With this regard, the same mode of calcium encoding could be shared by different cells, providing synchronization or the functional basis to implement more complex computational tasks.

Michael Forrest has shown that intracellular calcium dynamics may permit a Purkinje neuron to perform toggle and gain computations upon its inputs. So, showing how an ion concentration can be used as a computational variable - in particular, as a memory element: recording a history of firing and inputs, to dictate how the neuron responds to future inputs. Thus, this work hypothesizes that the membrane potential (V) is not the Purkinje cell's only coding variable but works alongside a calcium memory system. These two interact, with the calcium memory being encoded and decoded by the membrane potential. The toggle and gain computations are likely to be salient to network computations in the cerebellum, in the brain. Thus, ion computations can be important more globally than a single cell. Forrest terms this hypothesis: "ion to network computation".
