= ENOD40 =

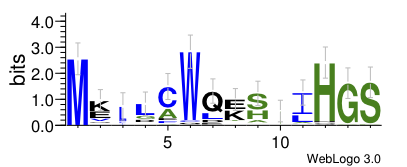
- A sequence logo for the ENOD40 peptide.

Identifiers
- Symbol: ENOD40
- Pfam: PF08247
- InterPro: IPR013186
Available protein structures:
- Pfam: structures / ECOD
- PDB: RCSB PDB; PDBe; PDBj
- PDBsum: structure summary

ENOD40
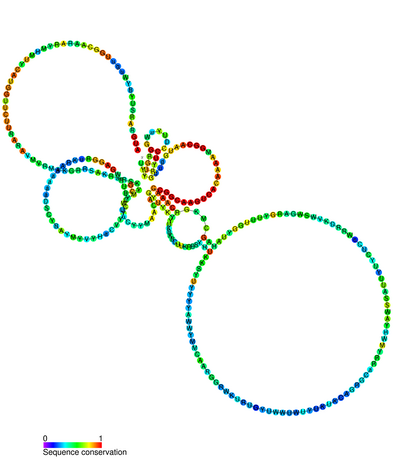
- ENOD40 secondary structure and sequence conservation

Identifiers
- Symbol: ENOD40
- Rfam: RF01845

Other data
- RNA type: Non-coding RNA
- Domain: Magnoliophyta
- PDB structures: PDBe

enod40, also known as early nodulin 40, is a gene found in flowering plants. The gene has characteristics of both protein and Non-coding RNA genes. There is some evidence that the non-coding characteristics of this gene are more widely conserved than the protein coding sequences. In soyabeans enod40 was found to be expressed during early stages of formation of nitrogen-fixing root nodules that are associated with symbiotic soil rhizobial bacteria. The gene is also active in roots containing fungi forming phosphate-acquiring arbuscular mycorrhiza. An interaction with a novel RNA-binding protein MtRBP1 (Medicago truncatula RNA-binding protein 1) investigated in the development of Root nodule suggests ENOD40 has a function of cytoplasmic relocalization of nuclear proteins. In the study of non-legume plants, the over-expression of ENOD40 in transgenic Arabidopsis lines was observed a reduction of cell expansion.

== See also ==
- Non-coding RNA#Bifunctional RNA
