= LysM domain =

Protein domain

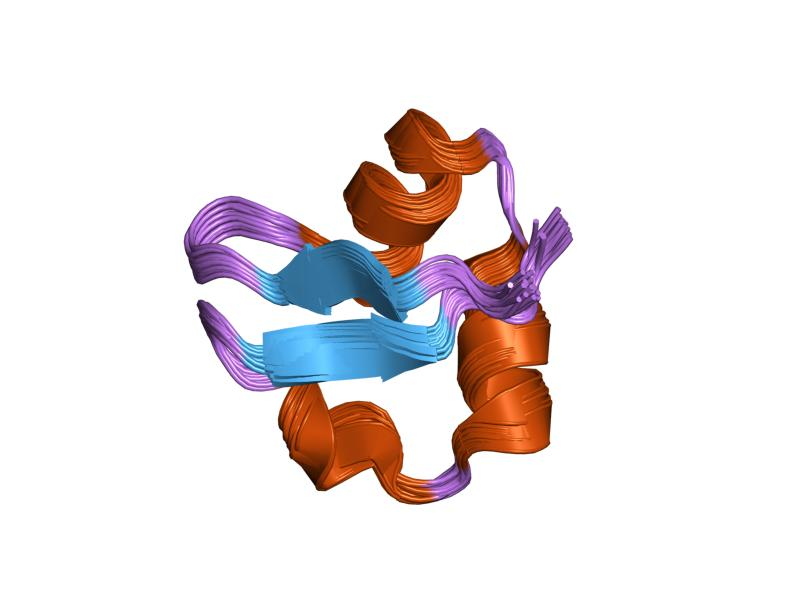

Identifiers
- Symbol: LysM
- Pfam: PF01476
- InterPro: IPR000644
- SMART: LysM
- PROSITE: PS51782
- SCOP2: 1e0g / SCOPe / SUPFAM
- CDD: cd00118
- Membranome: 1306
Available protein structures:
- PDB: IPR000644 PF01476 (ECOD; PDBsum)
- AlphaFold: IPR000644; PF01476

In molecular biology the LysM domain is a protein domain found in a wide variety of extracellular proteins and receptors. The LysM domain is named after the Lysin Motif which was the original name given to the sequence motif identified in bacterial proteins. The region was originally identified as a C-terminal repeat found in the Enterococcus hirae muramidase. The LysM domain is found in a wide range of microbial extracellular proteins, where the LysM domain is thought to provide an anchoring to extracellular polysaccharides such as peptidoglycan and chitin. LysM domains are also found in plant receptors, including NFP, the receptor for Nod factor which is necessary for the root nodule symbiosis between legumes and symbiotic bacteria. The LysM domain is typically between 44 and 65 amino acid residues in length. The structure of the LysM domain showed that it is composed of a pair of antiparallel beta strands separated by a pair of short alpha helices.

== See also ==
- Nod factor
