= Joel Keizer =

American biologist (1942-1999)

Joel E. Keizer
- Born: August 31, 1942
- Died: May 16, 1999 (aged 56)
- Occupation: academic
- Known for: Non-equilibrium thermodynamics, modelling insulin production
- Awards: Guggenheim fellowship (1986-1987)

Academic background
- Education: University of Oregon
- Thesis: A new approach for the justification of ensembles in quantum statistical mechanics. (1969)
- Doctoral advisor: Terrell Hill

Academic work
- Discipline: Biologist
- Sub-discipline: Thermodynamics
- Institutions: University of California, Davis
- Notable works: Statistical Thermodynamics of Nonequilibrium Processes

Joel E. Keizer (31 August 1942 - 16 May 1999) was an American biologist and university professor. He is principally known for his work in non-equilibrium thermodynamics and mathematical modelling of cellular phenomena, in particular human production of insulin.

== Canonical theory ==
Canonical theory is a molecular theory developed by Keizer and coworkers which claims to explain many physical, chemical, and biological processes in an unified and canonical way. Ronald F. Fox and Keizer showed the application of the canonical theory to chaos.

Keizer used the canonical form for the first formulation of statistical thermodynamics valid in far from equilibrium regimes, where the Onsager reciprocal relations and the Albert Einstein formula for the fluctuations do not work. Keizer also provided fluctuating generalizations of the Boltzmann equation and of hydrodynamics (fluctuating hydrodynamics). The applications of his work to biology are the reason that he was considered as one of the pioneers in the field of computational biology. Cosma Shalizi wrote:

Chapter five applies the canonical theory to various chemical and electrochemical processes. There is a detailed comparison of a model based on the formalism to actual experimental data for a calcium-regulated potassium channel in muscle cells, yielding remarkably close agreement (especially since the channel is really just a single molecule!)... Keizer was, until his premature death in May, 1999, an active and talented scientist who played a significant role not merely in the development of the formal structure of far from equilibrium thermodynamics, but also in its application to experiment, especially in biology. Unlike a number of others who have attempted such cross-overs, he made it work.

Besides the unification of disparate topics as chemical reactions, hydrodynamics, or heat transport in solids, the canonical theory has been applied to solving the problems of traditional disciplines as statistical mechanics.
