= Beta-carotene isomerase =

Class of enzymes

β-Carotene isomerase

Identifiers
- EC no.: 5.2.1.14

Databases
- IntEnz: IntEnz view
- BRENDA: BRENDA entry
- ExPASy: NiceZyme view
- KEGG: KEGG entry
- MetaCyc: metabolic pathway
- PRIAM: profile
- PDB structures: RCSB PDB PDBe PDBsum
Search
- PMC: articles
- PubMed: articles
- NCBI: proteins

Beta-carotene isomerase (EC 5.2.1.14, DWARF27 (gene)) is an enzyme with systematic name beta-carotene 9-cis-all-trans isomerase. This enzyme catalyses the following chemical reaction

all-trans-beta-carotene $\rightleftharpoons$ 9-cis-beta-carotene

The enzyme participates in a pathway leading to biosynthesis of strigolactones.
