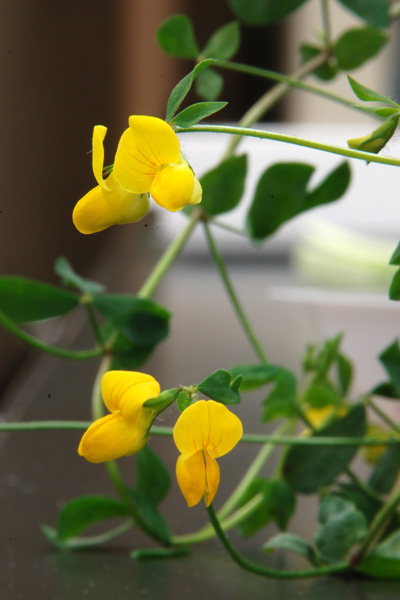

Scientific classification
- Kingdom: Plantae
- Clade: Tracheophytes
- Clade: Angiosperms
- Clade: Eudicots
- Clade: Rosids
- Order: Fabales
- Family: Fabaceae
- Subfamily: Faboideae
- Genus: Lotus
- Species: L. japonicus

Binomial name
- Lotus japonicus (Regel) K.Larsen

Synonyms
- Lotus corniculatus subsp. japonicus (Regel) H.Ohashi; Lotus corniculatus var. japonicus Regel; Lotus corniculatus f. hirtellus Nakai; Lotus corniculatus f. semibarbatus Nakai

= Lotus japonicus =

Species of legume

Lotus japonicus is a wild legume that belongs to family Fabaceae. Members of this family are very diverse, constituting about 20,000 species. They are of significant agricultural and biological importance as many of the legume species are rich sources of protein and oil and can also fix atmospheric nitrogen.

Lotus japonicus has become a model plant for genome studies in legumes, particularly in reference to rhizobial and arbuscular mycorrhizal symbiosis. Small genome size of about 470 Mb, diploid genome with 6 haploid chromosomes, a short life cycle of about 2 to 3 months and its perennial nature makes it a convenient plant to study.

Lotus japonicus does have several similar characteristics to the legume Medicago truncatula, but they are phylogenetically different and exhibit two different development systems for nodulation. L. japonicus has determinate nodules.
