= 9-cis-beta-carotene 9',10'-cleaving dioxygenase =

Class of enzymes

Identifiers
- EC no.: 1.13.11.68

Databases
- IntEnz: IntEnz view
- BRENDA: BRENDA entry
- ExPASy: NiceZyme view
- KEGG: KEGG entry
- MetaCyc: metabolic pathway
- PRIAM: profile
- PDB structures: RCSB PDB PDBe PDBsum
Search
- PMC: articles
- PubMed: articles
- NCBI: proteins

9-cis-beta-carotene 9',10'-cleaving dioxygenase (EC 1.13.11.68, CCD7 (gene), MAX3 (gene), NCED7 (gene)) is an enzyme with systematic name 9-cis-beta-carotene:O_{2} oxidoreductase (9',10'-cleaving). This enzyme catalyses the following chemical reaction

9-cis-beta-carotene + O_{2} $\rightleftharpoons$ 9-cis-10'-apo-beta-carotenal + beta-ionone

9-cis-beta-carotene 9',10'-cleaving dioxygenase contains Fe^{2+}.
