= Carlactone synthase =

Identifiers
- EC no.: 1.13.11.69

Databases
- IntEnz: IntEnz view
- BRENDA: BRENDA entry
- ExPASy: NiceZyme view
- KEGG: KEGG entry
- MetaCyc: metabolic pathway
- PRIAM: profile
- PDB structures: RCSB PDB PDBe PDBsum
Search
- PMC: articles
- PubMed: articles
- NCBI: proteins

Carlactone synthase (EC 1.13.11.69, CCD8 (gene), MAX4 (gene), NCED8 (gene)) is an enzyme with systematic name 9-cis-10'-apo-beta-carotenal:O2 oxidoreductase (14,15-cleaving, carlactone-forming). This enzyme catalyses the following chemical reaction

9-cis-10'-apo-beta-carotenal + 2 O_{2} $\rightleftharpoons$ carlactone + (2E,4E,6E)-7-hydroxy-4-methylhepta-2,4,6-trienal

Carlactone synthase contains Fe^{2+}.
