= All-trans-10'-apo-beta-carotenal 13,14-cleaving dioxygenase =

Identifiers
- EC no.: 1.13.11.70

Databases
- IntEnz: IntEnz view
- BRENDA: BRENDA entry
- ExPASy: NiceZyme view
- KEGG: KEGG entry
- MetaCyc: metabolic pathway
- PRIAM: profile
- PDB structures: RCSB PDB PDBe PDBsum
Search
- PMC: articles
- PubMed: articles
- NCBI: proteins

All-trans-10'-apo-beta-carotenal 13,14-cleaving dioxygenase (EC 1.13.11.70, CCD8 (gene), MAX4 (gene), NCED8 (gene)) is an enzyme with systematic name all-trans-10'-apo-beta-carotenal:O_{2} oxidoreductase (13,14-cleaving). This enzyme catalyses the following chemical reaction

all-trans-10'-apo-beta-carotenal + O_{2} $\rightleftharpoons$ 13-apo-beta-carotenone + (2E,4E,6E)-4-methylocta-2,4,6-trienedial

The enzyme contains Fe^{2+}.
