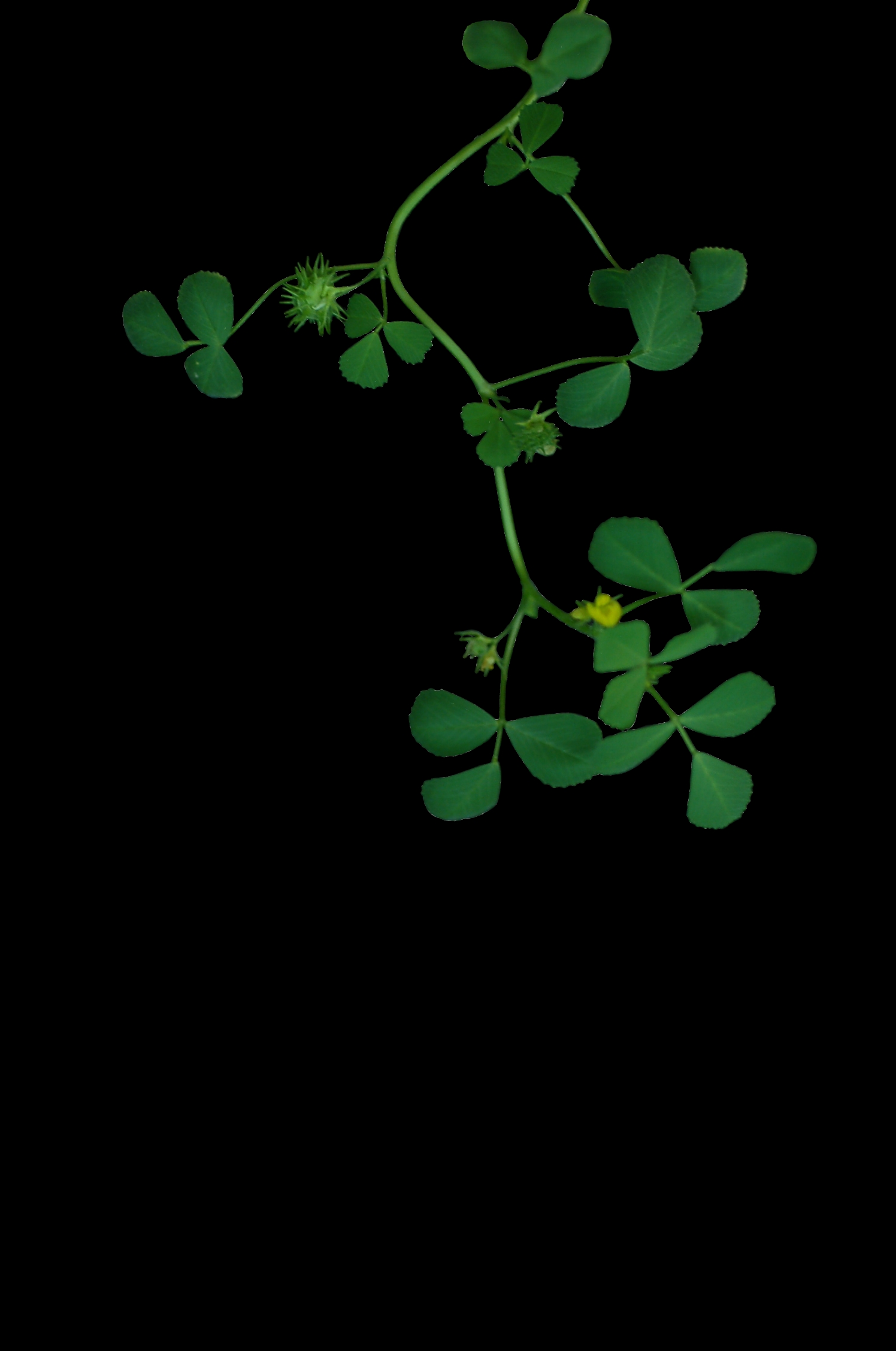

Conservation status
- Least Concern (IUCN 3.1)

Scientific classification
- Kingdom: Plantae
- Clade: Tracheophytes
- Clade: Angiosperms
- Clade: Eudicots
- Clade: Rosids
- Order: Fabales
- Family: Fabaceae
- Subfamily: Faboideae
- Genus: Medicago
- Species: M. truncatula

Binomial name
- Medicago truncatula Gaertn.

Synonyms
- Medicago tribuloides Desr. Medicago tribuloides var. breviaculeata Moris; Medicago truncatula var. breviaculeata (Moris) Urb. Medicago truncatula var. longiaculeata Urb. Medicago truncatula var. tribuloides (Desr.) Burnat; Medicago truncatula f. tricycla Nègre; Medicago truncatula var. tricycla (Nègre) Heyn

= Medicago truncatula =

Species of legume

Medicago truncatula, the barrelclover, strong-spined medick, barrel medic, or barrel medick, is a small annual legume native to the Mediterranean region that is used in genomic research.

== Description ==
It is a low-growing, clover-like plant growing 10–60 centimetres (4–24 in) tall with trifoliate leaves. Each leaflet is rounded, 1–2 cm (1/2–3/4 in) long, often with a dark spot in the center.

The flowers are yellow, produced singly or in a small inflorescence of two to five together. The fruit is a small, spiny pod.

== Ecology ==
It is an important forage crop species in Australia.

It forms symbioses with nitrogen-fixing rhizobia (Sinorhizobium meliloti and Sinorhizobium medicae) and arbuscular mycorrhizal fungi including Rhizophagus irregularis (previously known as Glomus intraradices). The model plant Arabidopsis thaliana does not form either symbiosis, making M. truncatula an important tool for studying these processes.

=== Symbioses with soil microorganisms ===
Researcher Toby Kiers of VU University Amsterdam and associates used M. truncatula to study symbioses between plants and fungi; they also investigated whether the partners in the relationship could distinguish between good and bad traders/suppliers. By using labeled carbon to track the source of nutrient flowing through the arbuscular mycorrhizal system, the researchers proved that the plants gave more carbon to the more generous fungus species. By restricting the amount of carbon the plants gave to the fungus, the researchers also demonstrated that the fungi distributed more phosphorus to the more generous plants.

== Sequencing of the genome ==
This species is studied as a model organism for legume biology because it has a small diploid genome, is self-fertile, has a rapid generation time and prolific seed production, is amenable to genetic transformation, and its genome has been sequenced.

The draft sequence of the genome of M. truncatula cultivar A17 was published in the journal Nature in 2011.

The sequencing was carried out by an international partnership of research laboratories involving researchers from the University of Oklahoma (US), J. Craig Venter Institute (US), Genoscope (France), and Sanger Centre (UK). Partner institutions included the University of Minnesota (US), University of California-Davis (US), the National Center for Genomic Resources (US), John Innes Centre (UK), Institut National de Recherche Agronomique (France), Munich Information Center for Protein Sequences (Germany), Wageningen University (the Netherlands), and Ghent University (Belgium). The Medicago truncatula Sequencing Consortium began in 2001 with a seed grant from the Samuel Roberts Noble Foundation. In 2003, the National Science Foundation and the European Union 6th Framework Programme began providing most of the funding. By 2009, 84% of the genome assembly had been completed.

The assembly of the genome sequence in M. truncatula was based on bacterial artificial chromosomes (BACs). This is the same approach used to sequence the genomes of humans, the fruitfly, Drosophila melanogaster, and the model plant, Arabidopsis thaliana. In July 2013, version 4.0 of the genome was released. This version combined sequences gained from shotgun sequencing with the BAC-based sequence assemblies, which has helped to fill in the gaps in the previously mapped sequences.

A parallel group known as the International Medicago Gene Annotation Group (IMGAG) is responsible for identifying and describing putative gene sequences within the genome sequence.

== Proteome ==
Proteomic investigation by mass spectrometry has been performed by Wienkoop et al 2004 and Larrainzar et al 2007.

== See also ==
- Genomics
