= Acaulospora rugosa =

Scientific classification
- Domain: Eukaryota
- Kingdom: Fungi
- Division: Glomeromycota
- Class: Glomeromycetes
- Order: Diversisporales
- Family: Acaulosporaceae
- Genus: Acaulospora
- Species: A. rugosa

Binomial name
- Acaulospora rugosa J.B.Morton (1986)

Species of fungus

Acaulospora rugosa is a species of fungus in the family Acaulosporaceae. It forms arbuscular mycorrhiza and vesicles in roots. Originally found in West Virginia in soil associated with Andropogon virginicus, the fungus was described as new to science in 1986.
