= Acaulospora lacunosa =

Scientific classification
- Domain: Eukaryota
- Kingdom: Fungi
- Division: Glomeromycota
- Class: Glomeromycetes
- Order: Diversisporales
- Family: Acaulosporaceae
- Genus: Acaulospora
- Species: A. lacunosa

Binomial name
- Acaulospora lacunosa J.B.Morton (1986)

Species of fungus

Acaulospora lacunosa is a species of fungus in the family Acaulosporaceae. It forms arbuscular mycorrhiza and vesicles in roots. Originally found in West Virginia in soil associated with Andropogon virginicus, the fungus was described as new to science in 1986. The specific epithet refers to the outermost wall of the spore, which has a characteristic appearance of the lunar surface.
