= Entrophospora etunicata =

Scientific classification
- Kingdom: Fungi
- Division: Glomeromycota
- Class: Glomeromycetes
- Order: Diversisporales
- Family: Acaulosporaceae
- Genus: Entrophospora
- Species: E. etunicata

Binomial name
- Entrophospora etunicata (W.N.Becker & Gerd.) Błaszk., Niezgoda, B.T.Goto & Magurno

Synonyms
- Claroideoglomus etunicatum (W.N.Becker & Gerd.) C.Walker & A.Schüßler; Glomus etunicatum W.N.Becker & Gerd.

Species of fungus

Entrophospora etunicata, is a species of fungus in the genus Entrophospora within the family Entrophosporaceae. It is an arbuscular mycorrhizal (AM) fungi that forms symbiotic relationships with the roots of various plants, facilitating nutrient exchange. This species has undergone two notable order changes since its description in 1997. It has agricultural and ecological significance as it assists with enhancing plant growth and soil health.

== Taxonomy and phylogeny ==
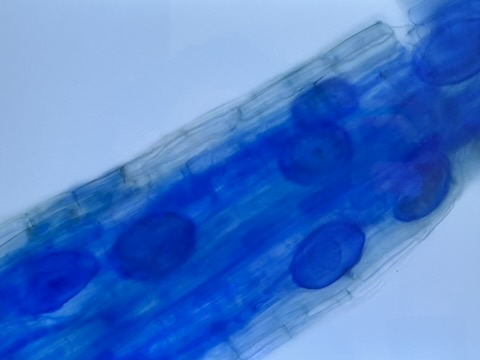
Entrophospora etunicata spores on roots

The etymology of the name derives from Greek for a "spore nourished from within" for Entrophospora and the Latin word etunicatus for "derived of its coat" referring to its "ephemeral outer wall".

As an AM fungi, E. etunicata belongs to the phylum Glomeromycota, a group encompassing over 300 described fungal species. The basionym for E. etunicatam is Glomus etunicatum. A synonym is Claroideoglomus etunicatum, after reclassification. In 2022, molecular phylogenetic analysis saw the fungus, and other related Glomus species, reclassified, leading to the creation of the Entrophosporales and the Entrophosporaceae family (formerly (Claroideoglomeraceae), containing the genera Entrophospora, Claroideoglomus, and Albahypha. Additional molecular phylogenic analysis has positioned E. etunicata with E. hanlinii and E. argentinensis sharing the closest phylogenic relationship.

== Morphology ==
Like most species in Glomeromycota, E. etunicata reproduces asexually with its coenocytic hyphae and production of glomerospores, with no known sexual state. Members of the genus Enterphospora have spores borne from within the neck of a pre-differentiated "sporiferous saccule", or a spore within a saccule. The spores regularly have 2-4 spore layers and hyaline to subhyaline or whitish funnel-shaped subtending hyphae. Spores are typically 60-160 μm in diameter, with hyphae measuring 5-10.2 μm. Its colour ranges from orange to red-brown with a globose shape.

Morphologically, E. etunicata is distinguished from all other Entrophospora by having only two spore layers to the spore wall, the first layer forming the surface of the spore. Neither of the layers is semi-flexible and both are even in thickness. The outer layer degrades and sloughs as spores age, so that it may be present in patches (usually detected in Melzers reagent) or appear as a granular layer. This characteristic is what Becker and Gerdemann referenced with the name "etunicata." The pore of the spore subtending hypha is closed by a septum continuous with the innermost laminae (sublayers) of the laminate spore wall layer of layer 2. This is in contrast to that of E. argentinensis, where its pore is closed by the innermost laminae of the laminate spore wall layer two and a septum continuous with the additional innermost spore wall layer three. Additionally, globose E. etunicata spores may be 1.4-fold larger.

== Ecology ==
As an AM fungus, E. etunicata forms a symbiotic relationship with the host plant and its root network. The life cycle of mycorrhizal fungi begins when a fungal spore germinates and hyphae grow toward a host root. E. etunicata forms arbuscules or coils through the cell walls of the root cortical cells. Outside of the root, E. etunicata interacts with organic soil matter and living roots of other plants resulting in the establishment of mycorrhizal networks that can then connect with other neighboring plants. The external hyphae of the fungus take up water and micronutrients such as nitrogen and phosphorus and then transfer them into the host cells. These micronutrients are exchanged through the arbuscles for carbon that is then stored in vesicles or new spores, allowing for E. etunicata to maintain its energy and future growth.

As AM fungi form intimate associations with about 80% of land plant species,E. etunicata is one of the most commonly occurring arbuscular fungi in the world with samples being found on every major continent, from the tundra of Alaska to the desert of Nigeria. Samples have been found throughout multiple discrete biomes in Brazil.

== Overall biology and relevance for humans ==
As E. etunicata was only characterized in 1977, and as its applications as an AM fungus are still being explored, it has no specific cultural relevance to humanity outside of the field of agriculture in general. Its importance to humanity lies in its potential effectiveness in the area of agriculture, both economically and ecologically. E. etunicata has been researched with various plant species and under a multitude of growing conditions to test its effectiveness with alleviating plant stress, improving the nutritional biomass of a plant, protecting against toxin injury, and improving sustainability.

It has shown the ability to enhance plant tolerance to abiotic stresses and promote plant growth in soil contaminated by heavy metals such as cadmium, and rare earth elements like lanthanum.E. etunicata has shown benefits as an alternative for improving the production of C. chinense seedlings and enhancing the anabolism of its health-promoting bioactive compounds by up to 144%. In Brazil, under field conditions, inoculation of a fast-growing tropical tree Schizolobium parahyba var. amazonicum with AM (Claroideoglomus etunicatum and Acaulospora sp.), increased wood yield by approximately 20%. It has shown benefits in alleviating combined boron toxicity and salt stress symptoms in maize plants. And, it has stimulated morphophysiological and gene expression resulting in higher photosynthetic rate and water use efficiency when used as a monospecific inoculation in both drought-tolerant and sensitive Caatinga Passion Fruit.

No data has been found to show arbuscular mycorrhizal fungi, and E. etunicata in particular, causes pathogenic illness or disease in humans or other animals. However, the use of AM fungi, has been shown to contribute to the overall improvement of soil health leading to an improvement of human health as a byproduct. The use of AM fungi plant inoculation can significantly increase the contents of medicinal active ingredients by (27%), with a particularly notable enhancement observed in flavonoids (68%) and terpenoids (53%).
