= Acaulospora denticulata =

Scientific classification
- Domain: Eukaryota
- Kingdom: Fungi
- Division: Glomeromycota
- Class: Glomeromycetes
- Order: Diversisporales
- Family: Acaulosporaceae
- Genus: Acaulospora
- Species: A. denticulata

Binomial name
- Acaulospora denticulata Sieverd. & S.Toro (1987)

Species of fungus

Acaulospora denticulata is a species of fungus in the family Acaulosporaceae. It forms arbuscular mycorrhiza and vesicles in roots. Isolated from garden soil in Colombia, the fungus was described as new to science in 1987.
