= Auxiliary cell =

The auxiliary cell is a spore-like structure that forms within the fungal family Gigasporaceae (order Gigasporales). Auxiliary cells have thin cell walls, echinulate (spiny), papillate, knobby or sometimes smooth surfaces, and are formed from hyphae after spore germination before the formation of mycorrhizae, and then on the extraradical hyphae in the soil. They may not be 'cells' in the biological sense of the word, as they are structures found with coenocytic hyphae belonging to members of the phylum (division) Glomeromycota. Mostly they are known from members of the Gigasporaceae. Currently this family contains Gigaspora, Scutellospora and Racocetra, but there are other generic names that have not been widely accepted (Dentiscutata, Cetraspora, Fuscutata and Quatunica) — all of these form auxiliary cells. Members of the genus Pacispora (another genus in the Diversisporales) are also said to produce a kind of auxiliary cell but this requires further confirmation.
