= Acaulospora polonica =

Scientific classification
- Domain: Eukaryota
- Kingdom: Fungi
- Division: Glomeromycota
- Class: Glomeromycetes
- Order: Diversisporales
- Family: Acaulosporaceae
- Genus: Acaulospora
- Species: A. polonica

Binomial name
- Acaulospora polonica Błaszk. (1988)

Species of fungus

Acaulospora polonica is a species of fungus in the family Acaulosporaceae. It forms arbuscular mycorrhiza and vesicles in roots. Found in Poland growing under Thuja occidentalis, it was described as a new species in 1988.
