= Acaulospora tuberculata =

Scientific classification
- Domain: Eukaryota
- Kingdom: Fungi
- Division: Glomeromycota
- Class: Glomeromycetes
- Order: Diversisporales
- Family: Acaulosporaceae
- Genus: Acaulospora
- Species: A. tuberculata

Binomial name
- Acaulospora tuberculata Janos & Trappe (1982)

Species of fungus

Acaulospora tuberculata is a species of fungus in the family Acaulosporaceae. It forms arbuscular mycorrhiza and vesicles in roots. Found growing in forest soil in Panama, the species was described as new to science in 1982.
