= Acaulospora myriocarpa =

Scientific classification
- Domain: Eukaryota
- Kingdom: Fungi
- Division: Glomeromycota
- Class: Glomeromycetes
- Order: Diversisporales
- Family: Acaulosporaceae
- Genus: Acaulospora
- Species: A. myriocarpa

Binomial name
- Acaulospora myriocarpa Spain, Sieverd. & N.C.Schenck

Species of fungus

Acaulospora myriocarpa is a species of fungus in the family Acaulosporaceae. It forms arbuscular mycorrhiza and vesicles in roots.
