= Acaulospora appendicula =

Scientific classification
- Domain: Eukaryota
- Kingdom: Fungi
- Division: Glomeromycota
- Class: Glomeromycetes
- Order: Diversisporales
- Family: Acaulosporaceae
- Genus: Acaulospora
- Species: A. appendicula

Binomial name
- Acaulospora appendicula Spain, Sieverd. & N.C.Schenck (1984)

Species of fungus

Acaulospora appendicula is a species of fungus in the family Acaulosporaceae. It forms arbuscular mycorrhiza and vesicles in roots. Found in Colombia, the species was described as new to science in 1984.
