= Acaulospora excavata =

Scientific classification
- Domain: Eukaryota
- Kingdom: Fungi
- Division: Glomeromycota
- Class: Glomeromycetes
- Order: Diversisporales
- Family: Acaulosporaceae
- Genus: Acaulospora
- Species: A. excavata

Binomial name
- Acaulospora excavata Ingleby & C.Walker (1994)

Species of fungus

Acaulospora excavata is a species of fungus in the family Acaulosporaceae. It forms arbuscular mycorrhiza and vesicles in roots. The fungus, first isolated from soil under the tree Terminalia ivorensis in the Ivory Coast, was described as new to science in 1994.
