= Acaulospora delicata =

Scientific classification
- Domain: Eukaryota
- Kingdom: Fungi
- Division: Glomeromycota
- Class: Glomeromycetes
- Order: Diversisporales
- Family: Acaulosporaceae
- Genus: Acaulospora
- Species: A. delicata

Binomial name
- Acaulospora delicata C.Walker, C.M.Pfeiff. & Bloss (1986)

Species of fungus

Acaulospora delicata is a species of fungus in the family Acaulosporaceae. It forms arbuscular mycorrhiza and vesicles in roots. Discovered growing in a pot culture with Sorghum sudanense, the fungus was described as new to science in 1986.
