= Acaulospora morrowiae =

Scientific classification
- Domain: Eukaryota
- Kingdom: Fungi
- Division: Glomeromycota
- Class: Glomeromycetes
- Order: Diversisporales
- Family: Acaulosporaceae
- Genus: Acaulospora
- Species: A. morrowiae

Binomial name
- Acaulospora morrowiae Spain & N.C.Schenck (1984)

Species of fungus

Acaulospora morrowiae is a species of fungus in the family Acaulosporaceae. It forms arbuscular mycorrhiza and vesicles in roots. Found in Colombia in soil with native grasses, the species was described as new to science in 1984.
