= Acaulospora longula =

Scientific classification
- Domain: Eukaryota
- Kingdom: Fungi
- Division: Glomeromycota
- Class: Glomeromycetes
- Order: Diversisporales
- Family: Acaulosporaceae
- Genus: Acaulospora
- Species: A. longula

Binomial name
- Acaulospora longula Spain & N.C.Schenck (1984)

Species of fungus

Acaulospora longula is a species of fungus in the family Acaulosporaceae. It forms arbuscular mycorrhiza and vesicles in roots. Found in Colombia in soil with native grasses, the species was described as new to science in 1984.
