= Acaulospora splendida =

Scientific classification
- Domain: Eukaryota
- Kingdom: Fungi
- Division: Glomeromycota
- Class: Glomeromycetes
- Order: Diversisporales
- Family: Acaulosporaceae
- Genus: Acaulospora
- Species: A. splendida

Binomial name
- Acaulospora splendida Sieverd., Chaverri & I.Rojas

Species of fungus

Acaulospora splendida is a species of fungus in the family Acaulosporaceae. Originally reported from Costa Rica in 1988, it forms arbuscular mycorrhiza and vesicles in roots.
