= Acaulospora thomii =

Scientific classification
- Kingdom: Fungi
- Division: Glomeromycota
- Class: Glomeromycetes
- Order: Diversisporales
- Family: Acaulosporaceae
- Genus: Acaulospora
- Species: A. thomii

Binomial name
- Acaulospora thomii Błaszk. (1988)

Species of fungus

Acaulospora thomii is a species of fungus in the family Acaulosporaceae. It forms arbuscular mycorrhiza and vesicles in roots. Found in Poland growing under Triticum aestivum, it was described as a new species in 1988.

== Taxonomy ==
Acaulospora thomii is a mycorrhizal fungus described by the Polish mycologist Janusz Błaszkowski in 1988 from agricultural soils in Poland. The holotype specimen was collected in Zielona Góra province on 17 July 1985, where it was growing under wheat (Triticum aestivum). Błaszkowski named the fungus after his son, "as a present for his first birthday". A. thomii belongs to the genus Acaulospora, producing spores laterally on a necked saccule (a small, sac-like structure). DNA studies have since shown A. thomii to be part of a clade of Acaulospora that occurs across Eurasia and Africa. It is considered an "arctic–boreal–alpine" species in its genus, with a wide ecological range.

== Description ==
Acaulospora thomii produces spores that are formed singly in the soil or occasionally in irregular-shaped, small sporocarps (spore-bearing structures) measuring 160–520 by 300–700 micrometre (μm). Unlike some related species, these sporocarps lack a protective outer layer called a peridium.

The spores of A. thomii are dark brown to black in colour when mature and light brown to brown in transmitted light. They are globose (spherical) to subglobose (almost spherical) in shape, measuring 150–185 μm in diameter, occasionally reaching up to 240 μm. The spores are usually attached to a thin, tube-like structure called a hypha (fungal filament) and are characterized by swollen hyphal terminals measuring 170–210 μm in diameter. These hyphal terminals become yellow to light yellow as they mature. The spore is distinguished by a three-layered cell wall that is 2.3–4.5 μm thick, with hyphal attachments that are spaced 70–250 μm apart.

The spore wall consists of six or seven distinct layers (labeled 1–7) organized into three main groups (labeled A, B, and C). Group A consists of a hyaline (translucent), unit-structured layer measuring 2.5–4.4 μm thick. Group B contains a hyaline, unit-structured layer (1.3–1.5 μm thick) and up to two thin membranous layers (up to 0.5 μm thick). Group C includes a hyaline, membranous layer (0.5–0.9 μm thick) with a "beaded" appearance and an innermost layer measuring approximately 0.5–1 μm thick.

== Ecology ==
Acaulospora thomii forms vesicular-arbuscular mycorrhizal associations with plants. In laboratory settings, it has been observed forming these beneficial relationships with wheat (Triticum aestivum) and corn (Zea mays) in pot cultures.
