= Acaulospora entreriana =

Scientific classification
- Kingdom: Fungi
- Division: Glomeromycota
- Class: Glomeromycetes
- Order: Diversisporales
- Family: Acaulosporaceae
- Genus: Acaulospora
- Species: A. entreriana

Binomial name
- Acaulospora entreriana M.S.Velazquez & Cabello (2008)

Species of fungus

Acaulospora entreriana is a species of fungus in the family Acaulosporaceae. It forms arbuscular mycorrhiza and vesicles in roots.
