= Acaulospora taiwania =

Scientific classification
- Domain: Eukaryota
- Kingdom: Fungi
- Division: Glomeromycota
- Class: Glomeromycetes
- Order: Diversisporales
- Family: Acaulosporaceae
- Genus: Acaulospora
- Species: A. taiwania

Binomial name
- Acaulospora taiwania H.T.Hu (1998)

Species of fungus

Acaulospora taiwania is a species of fungus in the family Acaulosporaceae. It forms arbuscular mycorrhiza and vesicles in roots. Found in Taiwan growing in association with Taiwania cryptomerioides, it was described as new to science in 1998.
