= Acaulospora alpina =

Scientific classification
- Domain: Eukaryota
- Kingdom: Fungi
- Division: Glomeromycota
- Class: Glomeromycetes
- Order: Diversisporales
- Family: Acaulosporaceae
- Genus: Acaulospora
- Species: A. alpina

Binomial name
- Acaulospora alpina Oehl, Sýkorová & Sieverd. (2006)

Species of fungus

Acaulospora alpina is a species of fungus in the family Acaulosporaceae. It forms arbuscular mycorrhiza and vesicles in plant roots. The fungus was discovered in Switzerland, in the rhizosphere of an alpine grassland at altitudes between 1,800 and 2,700 metres (5,900 and 8,900 ft). It has since been documented in Scotland and Scandinavia.

== Taxonomy ==
Acaulospora alpina is an arbuscular mycorrhizal fungus in the family Acaulosporaceae (division Glomeromycota). It was described in 2006 by the mycologists Fritz Oehl, Zuzana Sýkorová, and Ewald Sieverding, based on specimens from alpine grasslands of Switzerland. The epithet alpina alludes to its high-mountain origin in the Swiss Alps. Like other Acaulospora species, it produces spores laterally on a sporiferous saccule (sac-like base) rather than at the tip of a hypha. Molecular analyses confirmed A. alpina as a distinct species characteristic of acidic alpine soils.

== Description ==
This microscopic fungus forms small, dark yellow to orange-brown spores measuring 65–85 μm in diameter. The spores are more or less spherical (globose to subglobose) and develop laterally on the neck of a hyaline saccule (the defining character of genus Acaulospora). Spore walls are multi-layered and ornamented with fine warts. When observed under a compound microscope, the subtending hypha and spore base have a distinctive circular scar (or cicatrix) about 14 μm wide where it attached to the saccule. A. alpina forms arbuscular mycorrhizae with plant roots, facilitating nutrient exchange. It has been successfully detected in field roots via DNA sequences. Like many alpine glomeromycetes, it does not form large visible sporocarps (fruiting bodies) but rather loose spores in soil.

== Habitat and distribution ==
Acaulospora alpina appears to be specialized to high-elevation grassland ecosystems. It was originally isolated from neutral-to-acidic meadow soils in the Swiss Alps (Graubünden, about 2000 m elevation). The fungus grows in alpine and subalpine meadow vegetation, often in association with grasses and herbs under cold climate conditions. It has since been reported from other mountainous regions of Europe, including alpine meadows in Scotland and Scandinavia where similar acidic grassland soils. A 2011 study documented A. alpina in upland moorland of Scotland, representing a first record for the United Kingdom.
