= Acaulospora koskei =

Scientific classification
- Domain: Eukaryota
- Kingdom: Fungi
- Division: Glomeromycota
- Class: Glomeromycetes
- Order: Diversisporales
- Family: Acaulosporaceae
- Genus: Acaulospora
- Species: A. koskei

Binomial name
- Acaulospora koskei Błaszk. (1995)

Species of fungus

Acaulospora koskei is a species of fungus in the family Acaulosporaceae. It forms arbuscular mycorrhiza and vesicles in roots. Found in Poland, where it was collected from soil under Ammophila arenaria, it was described as a new species in 1996.

== Taxonomy ==
Acaulospora koskei is an arbuscular mycorrhizal fungus named by Janusz Błaszkowski in 1993 in honour of the American mycologist Richard E. Koske. Błaszkowski recovered this fungus during surveys of Poland's coastal dunes in the early 1990s. It was formally described as a new species in 1993 (published in 1994) in the journal Mycological Research. A. koskei belongs to Acaulospora, a genus characterized by spores borne laterally on a stalked saccule (a small, sac-like structure).

== Description ==
Acaulospora koskei produces globe-shaped (globose) spores 140–260 μm in diameter – relatively large for the genus. Young spores are pale orange-white, maturing to reddish-orange-brown. The spore wall is complex, consisting of six layers grouped into three complexes. Some layers stain reddish in Melzer's iodine, a trait separating it from similar species. The "mouth" where the spore was attached to its saccule is surrounded by a small collared pore about 20–35 μm wide. A. koskei forms typical arbuscular mycorrhizae in plant roots. Its mycorrhizal structures (vesicles and arbuscules) are difficult to see in field-collected roots but can be produced in laboratory pot cultures. Under the microscope, its hyphae and vesicles resemble those of other common AM fungi.

== Habitat and distribution ==
Acaulospora koskei was originally isolated from maritime sand dunes along the Baltic coast in Poland. The holotype came from Slovincian National Park, where it was found in association with dune grasses (Ammophila arenaria) and other pioneer plants on coastal sands. This fungus appears well adapted to sandy, nutrient-poor soils.
