= Acaulospora gedanensis =

Scientific classification
- Domain: Eukaryota
- Kingdom: Fungi
- Division: Glomeromycota
- Class: Glomeromycetes
- Order: Diversisporales
- Family: Acaulosporaceae
- Genus: Acaulospora
- Species: A. gedanensis

Binomial name
- Acaulospora gedanensis Błaszk. (1988)

Species of fungus

Acaulospora gedanensis is a species of fungus in the family Acaulosporaceae. It forms arbuscular mycorrhiza and vesicles in roots. Found in Poland growing under Festuca ovina, it was described as a new species in 1988.
