= Acaulospora foveata =

Scientific classification
- Domain: Eukaryota
- Kingdom: Fungi
- Division: Glomeromycota
- Class: Glomeromycetes
- Order: Diversisporales
- Family: Acaulosporaceae
- Genus: Acaulospora
- Species: A. foveata

Binomial name
- Acaulospora foveata Trappe & Janos (1982)

Species of fungus

Acaulospora foveata is a species of fungus in the family Acaulosporaceae. It forms arbuscular mycorrhiza and vesicles in roots. Found in Mexico in soil associated with sugarcane (Saccharum officinarum), the species was described as new to science in 1982.
