= Acaulospora elegans =

Scientific classification
- Domain: Eukaryota
- Kingdom: Fungi
- Division: Glomeromycota
- Class: Glomeromycetes
- Order: Diversisporales
- Family: Acaulosporaceae
- Genus: Acaulospora
- Species: A. elegans

Binomial name
- Acaulospora elegans Trappe & Gerd.

Species of fungus

Acaulospora elegans is a species of fungus in the family Acaulosporaceae. It forms arbuscular mycorrhiza and vesicles in roots.
