= Acaulospora terricola =

Scientific classification
- Kingdom: Fungi
- Division: Glomeromycota
- Class: Glomeromycetes
- Order: Diversisporales
- Family: Acaulosporaceae
- Genus: Acaulospora
- Species: A. terricola

Binomial name
- Acaulospora terricola Swarupa, Kunwar & Manohar.

Species of fungus

Acaulospora terricola is a species of fungus in the family Acaulosporaceae. It forms arbuscular mycorrhiza and vesicles in roots. It was first identified in India in 2003.
