= Acaulospora capsicula =

Scientific classification
- Domain: Eukaryota
- Kingdom: Fungi
- Division: Glomeromycota
- Class: Glomeromycetes
- Order: Diversisporales
- Family: Acaulosporaceae
- Genus: Acaulospora
- Species: A. capsicula

Binomial name
- Acaulospora capsicula Błaszk.

Species of fungus

Acaulospora capsicula is a species of fungus in the family Acaulosporaceae. It forms arbuscular mycorrhiza and vesicles in roots. It can be distinguished easily from other species of the same genus by spore color and wall structure.
