= Acaulospora rehmii =

Scientific classification
- Domain: Eukaryota
- Kingdom: Fungi
- Division: Glomeromycota
- Class: Glomeromycetes
- Order: Diversisporales
- Family: Acaulosporaceae
- Genus: Acaulospora
- Species: A. rehmii

Binomial name
- Acaulospora rehmii Sieverd. & S.Toro (1987)

Species of fungus

Acaulospora rehmii is a species of fungus in the family Acaulosporaceae. It forms arbuscular mycorrhiza and vesicles in roots. Isolated from the soil of a cultivated field in Colombia, the fungus was described as new to science in 1987.
