= Acaulospora sporocarpia =

Scientific classification
- Domain: Eukaryota
- Kingdom: Fungi
- Division: Glomeromycota
- Class: Glomeromycetes
- Order: Diversisporales
- Family: Acaulosporaceae
- Genus: Acaulospora
- Species: A. sporocarpia

Binomial name
- Acaulospora sporocarpia S.M.Berch

Species of fungus

Acaulospora sporocarpia is a species of fungus in the family Acaulosporaceae. It forms arbuscular mycorrhiza and vesicles in roots.
