= Acaulospora scrobiculata =

Scientific classification
- Domain: Eukaryota
- Kingdom: Fungi
- Division: Glomeromycota
- Class: Glomeromycetes
- Order: Diversisporales
- Family: Acaulosporaceae
- Genus: Acaulospora
- Species: A. scrobiculata

Binomial name
- Acaulospora scrobiculata Trappe

Species of fungus

Acaulospora scrobiculata is a species of fungus in the family Acaulosporaceae. It forms arbuscular mycorrhiza and vesicles in roots. Originally described in Mexico, it is found throughout the world.
