= Acaulospora nicolsonii =

Scientific classification
- Domain: Eukaryota
- Kingdom: Fungi
- Division: Glomeromycota
- Class: Glomeromycetes
- Order: Diversisporales
- Family: Acaulosporaceae
- Genus: Acaulospora
- Species: A. nicolsonii

Binomial name
- Acaulospora nicolsonii C.Walker, L.E.Reed & F.E.Sanders

Species of fungus

Acaulospora nicolsonii is a species of fungus in the family Acaulosporaceae. It forms arbuscular mycorrhiza and vesicles in roots. It was first described in 1984 in a bulletin of the British Mycological Society.
