= Entrophospora =

Scientific classification
- Domain: Eukaryota
- Kingdom: Fungi
- Division: Glomeromycota
- Class: Glomeromycetes
- Order: Diversisporales
- Family: Acaulosporaceae
- Genus: Entrophospora; R.N.Ames & R.W.Schneid. (1979)

Type species
- Entrophospora infrequens (I.R.Hall) R.N.Ames & R.W.Schneid. (1979)

Genus of fungi

Entrophospora is a genus of fungi in the family Acaulosporaceae of the Glomeromycota. The name is derived from the Greek words en (within), trophos (nourished or reared), and spora (spore). The generic description was emended in 2011.

The following species are recognized in this genus:

- Entrophospora argentinensis Błaszk., B.T.Goto, Magurno, Niezgoda & Cabello
- Entrophospora candida (E.Furrazola, Kaonongbua & Bever) Błaszk., Niezgoda, B.T.Goto & Magurno
- Entrophospora claroidea (N.C.Schenck & G.S.Sm.) Błaszk., Niezgoda, B.T.Goto & Magurno
- Entrophospora drummondii (Błaszk. & Renker) Błaszk., Niezgoda, B.T.Goto & Magurno
- Entrophospora etunicata (W.N.Becker & Gerd.) Błaszk., Niezgoda, B.T.Goto & Magurno
- Entrophospora furrazolae Magurno, Niezgoda, B.T.Goto & Błaszk.
- Entrophospora glacialis Zubek, Niezgoda, B.T.Goto, Magurno & Błaszk.
- Entrophospora hexagoni Rhatwal & Gandhe
- Entrophospora infrequens (I.R.Hall) R.N.Ames & R.W.Schneid.
- Entrophospora lamellosa (Dalpé, Koske & Tews) Błaszk., Niezgoda, B.T.Goto & Magurno
- Entrophospora lutea (L.J.Kenn., J.C.Stutz & J.B.Morton) Błaszk., Niezgoda, B.T.Goto & Magurno
- Entrophospora walkeri (Błaszk. & Renker) Błaszk., Niezgoda, B.T.Goto & Magurno
