= Paradentiscutata baiana =

Scientific classification
- Kingdom: Fungi
- Division: Glomeromycota
- Class: Glomeromycetes
- Order: Diversisporales
- Family: Gigasporaceae
- Genus: Paradentiscutata
- Species: P. baiana

Binomial name
- Paradentiscutata baiana Goto et al., 2012

Species of fungus

Paradentiscutata baiana is a species of fungus. It is characterised by introverted ornamentations on the spore wall; the spore wall structure and germ shield morphology. It was first isolated in northeast Brazil, and can be distinguished by the projections on the outer spore surface.
