= Acaulospora walkeri =

Scientific classification
- Domain: Eukaryota
- Kingdom: Fungi
- Division: Glomeromycota
- Class: Glomeromycetes
- Order: Diversisporales
- Family: Acaulosporaceae
- Genus: Acaulospora
- Species: A. walkeri

Binomial name
- Acaulospora walkeri Kramad. & Hedger (1990)

Species of fungus

Acaulospora walkeri is a species of fungus in the family Acaulosporaceae. It forms arbuscular mycorrhiza and vesicles in roots. It is found in Indonesia, where it associates with Theobroma cacao.
