= TMEM128 =

Protein and gene in humans

Identifiers
- Aliases: TMEM128, transmembrane protein 128
- External IDs: MGI: 1913559; GeneCards: TMEM128

Gene location (Human)
Chr.	Chromosome 4 (human)
Band	4p16.3	Start	4,235,542 bp
Band	4p16.3	End	4,248,223 bp

Gene location (Mouse)
Chr.	Chromosome 5 (mouse)
Band	5|5 B3	Start	38,417,529 bp
Band	5|5 B3	End	38,426,978 bp
RNA expression pattern
Bgee	Human / Mouse (ortholog); Top expressed in: oocyte; secondary oocyte; skin of arm; C1 segment; palpebral conjunctiva; seminal vesicula; pancreatic epithelial cell; hypothalamus; synovial joint; corpus epididymis / Top expressed in: spermatocyte; medullary collecting duct; renal corpuscle; facial motor nucleus; endocardial cushion; medial ganglionic eminence; epithelium of lens; right kidney; endothelial cell of lymphatic vessel; superior cervical ganglion; More reference expression data
BioGPS	n/a
Gene ontology
Molecular function	protein binding; molecular function
Cellular component	integral component of membrane; membrane; cellular component
Biological process	biological process
Sources:Amigo / QuickGO
Orthologs
Databases	NCBI: entry; OMA: entry
Species	Human	Mouse
Entrez	85013	66309
Ensembl	ENSG00000132406	ENSMUSG00000067365
UniProt	Q5BJH2	Q9CZB9
RefSeq (mRNA)	NM_001297551; NM_001297552; NM_032927	NM_025480; NM_001356960
RefSeq (protein)	NP_001284480; NP_001284481; NP_116316	NP_079756; NP_001343889
Location (UCSC)	Chr 4: 4.24 – 4.25 Mb	Chr 5: 38.42 – 38.43 Mb
PubMed search
- Wikidata
View/Edit Human	View/Edit Mouse

TMEM128, also known as Transmembrane Protein 128, is a protein that in humans is encoded by the TMEM128 gene. TMEM128 has three variants, varying in 5' UTR's and start codon location. TMEM128 contains four transmembrane domains and is localized in the Endoplasmic Reticulum membrane. TMEM128 contains a variety of regulation at the gene, transcript, and protein level. While the function of TMEM128 is poorly understood, it interacts with several proteins associated with the cell cycle, signal transduction, and memory.

== Gene ==
The TMEM128, or transmembrane protein 128, gene in humans is located on the minus strand at 4p16.3. TMEM128 contains 5 exons total and is 12,701 base pairs long including introns.

=== Transcripts ===
There are two isoforms of TMEM128. Isoform 1 being the longest, consists of two variants differing in the 3' UTR region. Variant 1 mRNA is 1,243 base pairs long while Variant 2 mRNA is 1,241 base pairs long. Isoform 2 differs in the 5' UTR region of the protein and uses a different start codon location compared to the first variant. This variant is longer at 1,785 base pairs and has a different N-terminus.

=== Neighboring genes ===
TMEM128 is neighbored upstream by LYAR, Ly1 antibody reactive, and downstream by OTOP1, Otopetrin 1.

== Protein ==
=== Isoform 1 ===
TMEM128 Isoform 1 translates into a protein of 165 amino acids long, containing four transmembrane domains. These domains exist at amino acids 49–69, 81–101, 119–139, and 144–164. Isoform 1 is18,882 Da and has a pI of 6.27. Using compositional analysis, the amino acid composition is similar to the average protein and there are no significant repeats in the protein.

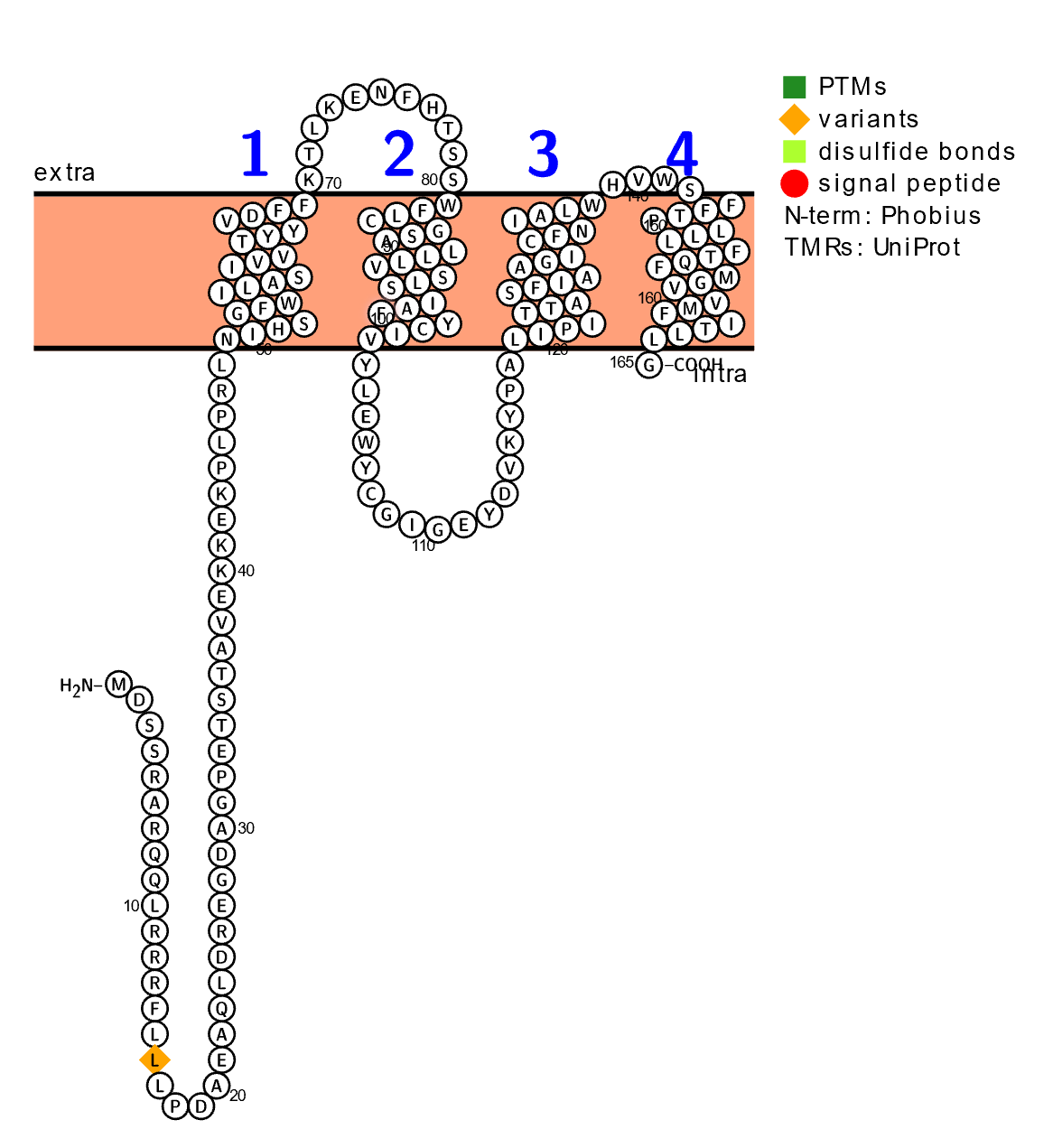
Predicted Secondary Structure for TMEM128

=== Isoform 2 ===
Isoform 2 translates into a protein of 141 amino acids long, also containing four transmembrane domains. Isoform 2 has a different molecular weight and isoelectric point compared to Isoform 1, coming in at 16,093 Da and having a pI of 6.8.

=== Secondary structure ===
Secondary structure composition
Type of secondary structure	Number of amino acids	Percent composition
Alpha helix	34	20.61%
Extended strand	59	35.76%
Random coil	72	43.64%

Predicted secondary structure composition shows that most of the secondary structure consists of random coils. No disulfide bonds are predicted to be present.

Membrane topology of TMEM128 shows the four transmembrane domains, longer N-terminus, and shorter C terminus.

=== Tertiary structure ===
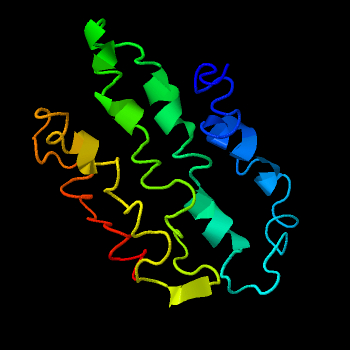
Predicted Tertiary Structure of TMEM128 as predicted by I-TASSER

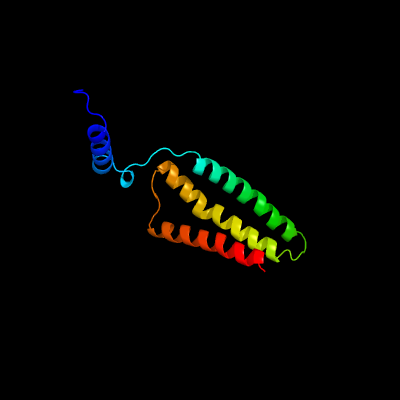
Predicted 3-D structure of TMEM128 as predicted by PHYRE2

Tertiary structure is predicted to have four spiral domains in TMEM128. These domains are the transmembrane sections of the protein. For the above models, it is colored rainbow from N-terminus to C-terminus.

== Regulation of expression ==
=== Gene level regulation ===
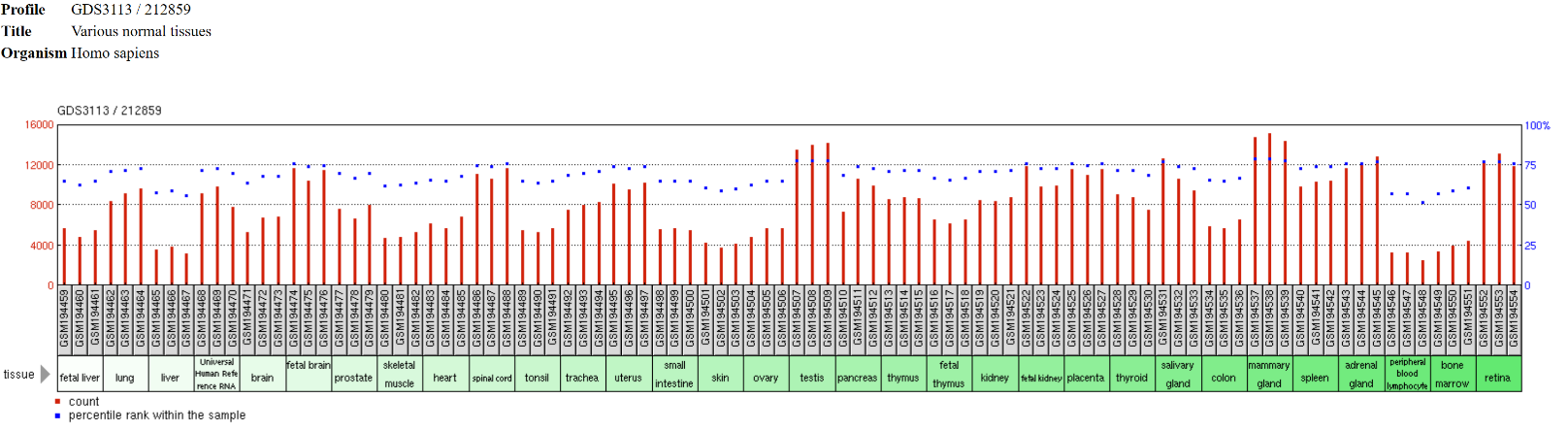
TMEM128 mRNA expression by tissue type in humans

Several promotors/enhancers of TMEM128 exist, with the GH04J00427 promotor located near the start of transcription, the GH04J004540 enhancer located downstream, and GH04J004264 enhancer located upstream of their target gene. TMEM128 sequence also contains many binding sites for various transcription factors, including TATA box, CCAAT binding protein, and cAMP-responsive element binding protein.

Expression of TMEM128 is also regulated at the gene level through differential tissue expression as seen with the image to the left. Red bars represent absolute expression while blue dots represent relative expression. TMEM128 is expressed highly in areas such as the adrenal gland and spinal cord, while is lower in areas such as the liver and bone marrow.

=== Transcript level regulation ===
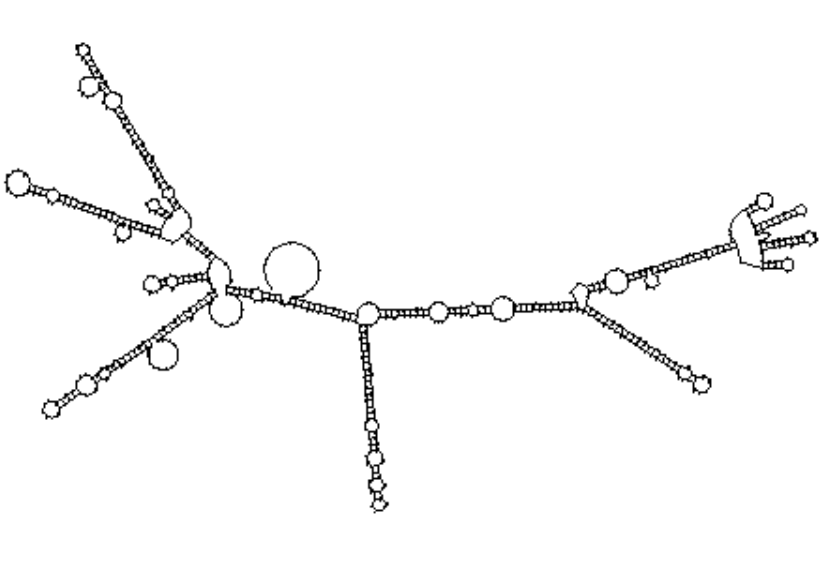
Predicted stem loops for 3' UTR of TMEM128

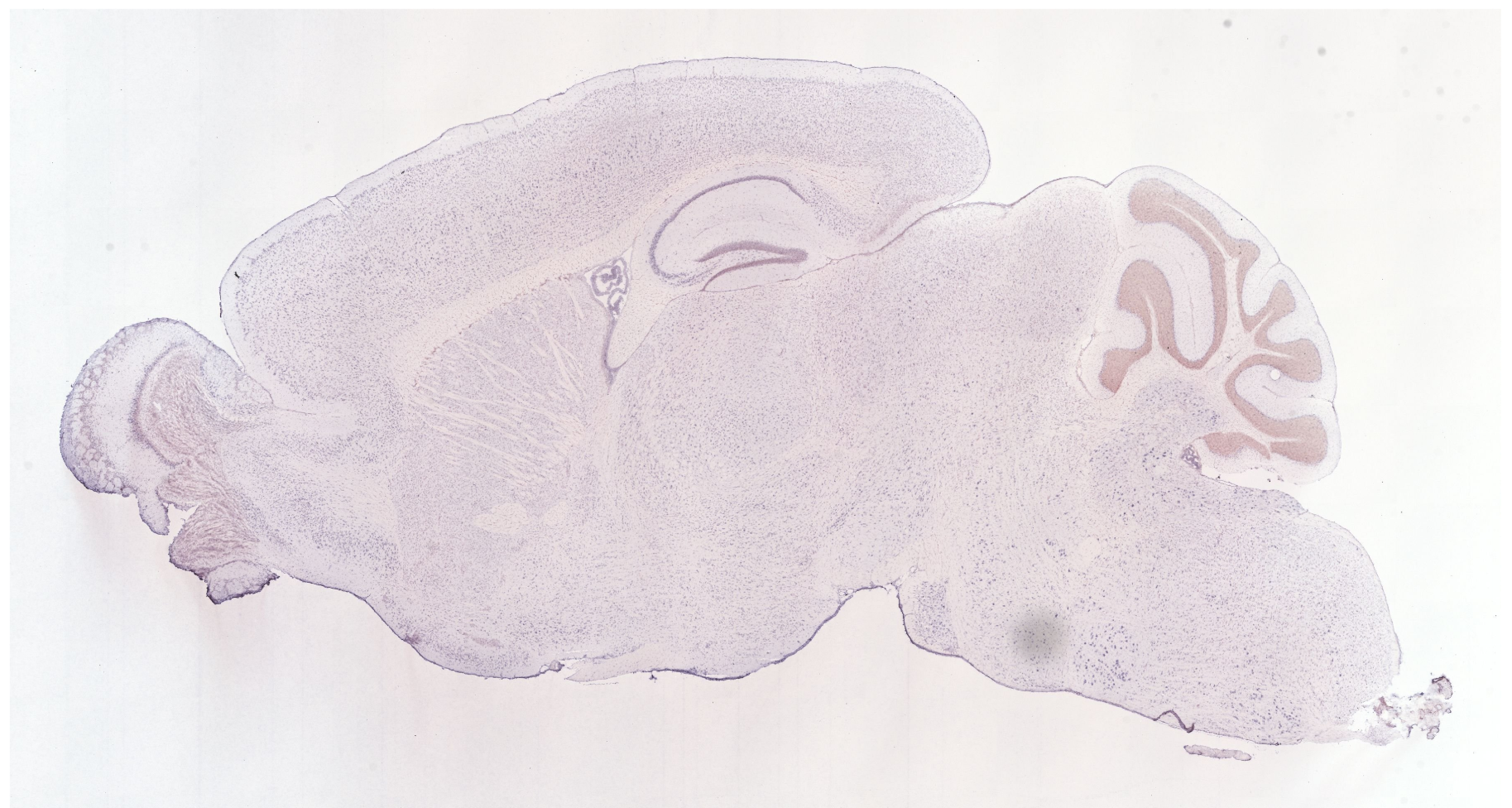
TMEM128 RNA expression in a mouse brain

Several miRNAs have binding sites on the 3' UTR of TMEM128 including:

- has-miR-300
- has-miR-188-5p
- has-miR-506-3p
- has-miR-3163
- has-miR-548t-5p
- has-miR-3163
- has-miR-548t-5p
- has-miR-548az-5p

These miRNAs can participate in RNA silencing to prevent the expression of the mRNA.

Analyses of mouse brains show lack of region-specific expression throughout.

=== Protein level regulation ===
In terms of protein regulation, TMEM128 contains many different post-translational domains including glycation, phosphorylation, SUMOylation, and O-GlcNAc as seen below:

Modification	Amino acid number
Phosphorylation	3, 4, 52, 124, 135, 162
Glycation	70, 73, 115
Nuclear export signal	88-95
SUMOylation	39-42, 115–118, 161–165
O-GlcNAc	3, 4, 34, 35, 123
Acetylation	40, 41, 43, 73

Post-translational modification alters protein structure and can thus alter protein function and viability.

==== Sub-cellular localization ====
TMEM128 was found to be located in the Endoplasmic Reticulum membrane, with the N-terminus and C-terminus facing into the cytoplasm.

== Evolution ==
=== Paralogs ===
There are no known paralogs of TMEM128.

=== Orthologs ===
Orthologs of TMEM128 have not been found outside of Eukaryotes. Inside of Eukaryotes, TMEM128 orthologs have been found in mammals, birds, and several fungi. Mammals contained the highest amount of conservation at no less than 71% conservation. The most distant ortholog detected was the Diversispora epigaea, a fungus. The transmembrane domains of this protein remain the most conserved throughout species, with key amino acids Trp51, Trp139, and Trp142 being conserved in all species with orthologous proteins. All information below was obtained through NCBI BLAST.

Orthologs of TMEM128
Genus and species	Common name	Date of Divergence (MYA)	Accession number	Sequence length	Sequence identity
Homo sapiens	Human	0	NP_001284480.1	165	100%
Rhinopithecus roxellana	Golden snub-nosed monkey	28.81	XP_010355887.2	165	97%
Mus musculus	House mouse	89	NP_001343889.1	163	81%
Microtus ochrogaster	Prairie vole	89	XP_005366021	164	80%
Ovis aries	Sheep	94	XP_014952114.2	165	83%
Vulpes vulpes	Red fox	94	XP_025854088.1	165	82%
Pteropus vampyrus	Large flying fox	94	XP_011372965.1	165	81%
Orcinus orca	Killer whale	94	XP_004269680.1	165	81%
Monodelphis domestica	Gray short-tailed opossum	160	XP_001371407.3	170	71%
Taeniopygia guttata	Zebra finch	318	XP_002193492.3	173	68%
Alligator sinensis	Chinese alligator	318	XP_006016834.1	172	67%
Pogona vitticeps	Central bearded dragon	318	XP_020633929.1	163	62%
Xenopus laevis	African clawed frog	351.7	NP_001084889.1	166	52%
Orbicella faveolata	Mountainous star coral	687	XP_020610022.1	171	38%
Exaiptasia pallida	Sea anenmone	687	XP_028518835.1	169	36%
Octopus vulgaris	Common octopus	736	XP_029645279.1	184	33%
Brachionus plicatilis	N/A	736	RNA25638.1	170	28%
Crassostrea virginica	Eastern oyster	736	XP_022343076.1	200	28%
Diversispora epigaea	N/A	1017	RHZ70611.1	176	24%

=== Mutation rate ===
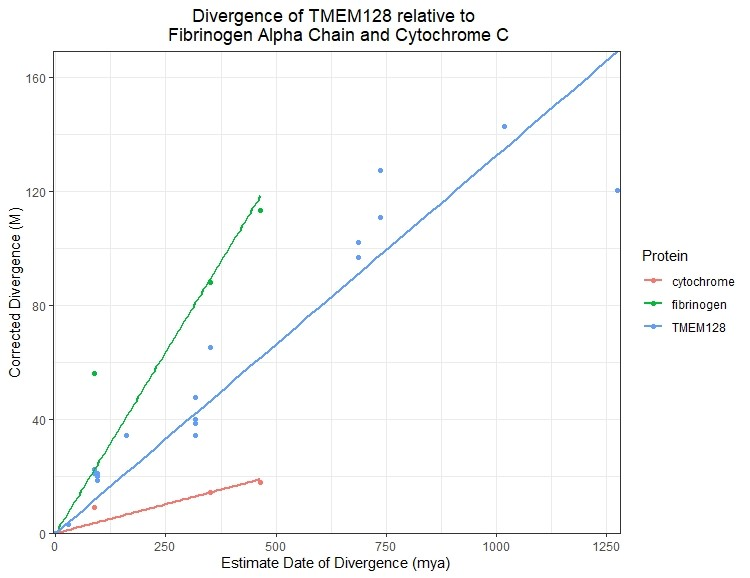
Divergence of TMEM128 Relative to Fibrinogen Alpha Chain and Cytochrome C

The evolution rate is at a medium pace, slower than the fibrinogen alpha chain but faster than cytochrome c, suggesting neither positive or negative selection at this locus.

== Interacting proteins ==
TMEM128 has been found via yeast two-hybrid assays to interact with:

- Arc/Arg 3.1, also known as Activity-regulated cytoskeleton-associated protein, which helps facilitate learning and memory processes
- GRB2, also known as Growth factor receptor-bound protein 2, which is involved in cell development and signal transduction.
- BCL2L13, also known as B-cell lymphoma 2-like 13, which is an apoptosis facilitator
- CLN8, also known as Ceroid-lipofuscinosis neuronal 8, which acts as a receptor in the Golgi and Endoplasmic Reticulum.
- RABAC1, also known as Prenylated Rab acceptor 1, which assists in vesicle transport.
- TMPRSS2, also known as Transmembrane protease, serine 2, which has a poorly understood function.
- GJB5, also known as Gap junction beta-5 protein or connexin-31.1, which functions as a gap junction.

== Function ==
The biological function of TMEM128 is still poorly understood. As this is a transmembrane protein, common functions may include receptors, channels, or anchorage. Because TMEM128 has post-translational modification sites, alternative protein states may be present that permit TMEM128 to have different forms. For example, phosphorylation of TMEM128 may make it bind to different substrates through conformational change. TMEM128 also has a variety of interactions with other proteins as discussed above, suggesting it may have a broad range of action.

== Clinical significance ==
=== Cancer ===
TMEM128 has been found to show moderate to strong positivity in some patients with carcinoma, with other types of cancer such as melanoma, glioma, breast, ovarian, renal, and pancreatic showing weak to moderate positivity. TMEM128 also has been found to show low cancer specificity.

=== Skeletal muscle ===
TMEM128 expression is experimentally associated with presence of the ROR alpha1 protein, as TMEM128 was found in lower quantities when ROR alpha1 was deleted.

=== Skin ===
TMEM128 expression was lowered following a null mutation of TAp63 in skin cells.

=== Cardiac muscle ===
TMEM128 expression was increased following a Trypanosoma cruzi infection.

=== Neurological diseases ===
While it has been associated with several diseases such as Wolf-Hirschhorn Syndrome, no evidence exists for the exact cause of this syndrome and may only be correlation because of location on chromosome 4

=== Mutations ===
Several SNPs have been found in association with TMEM128:

Key SNPs of TMEM128
mRNA position	Amino acid position	dbSNP rs#	Reference allele	SNP allele	Function
169	43	rs771177507	A	C	Missense
186	49	rs146625911	A	C	Missense
204	55	rs1434953873	G	T	Missense
270	77	rs13135886	A	G	Missense
463	139	rs757745482	T	C	Missense
466	142	rs1213450146	G	A	Nonsense
512	158	rs202215273	G	A, T	Missense
