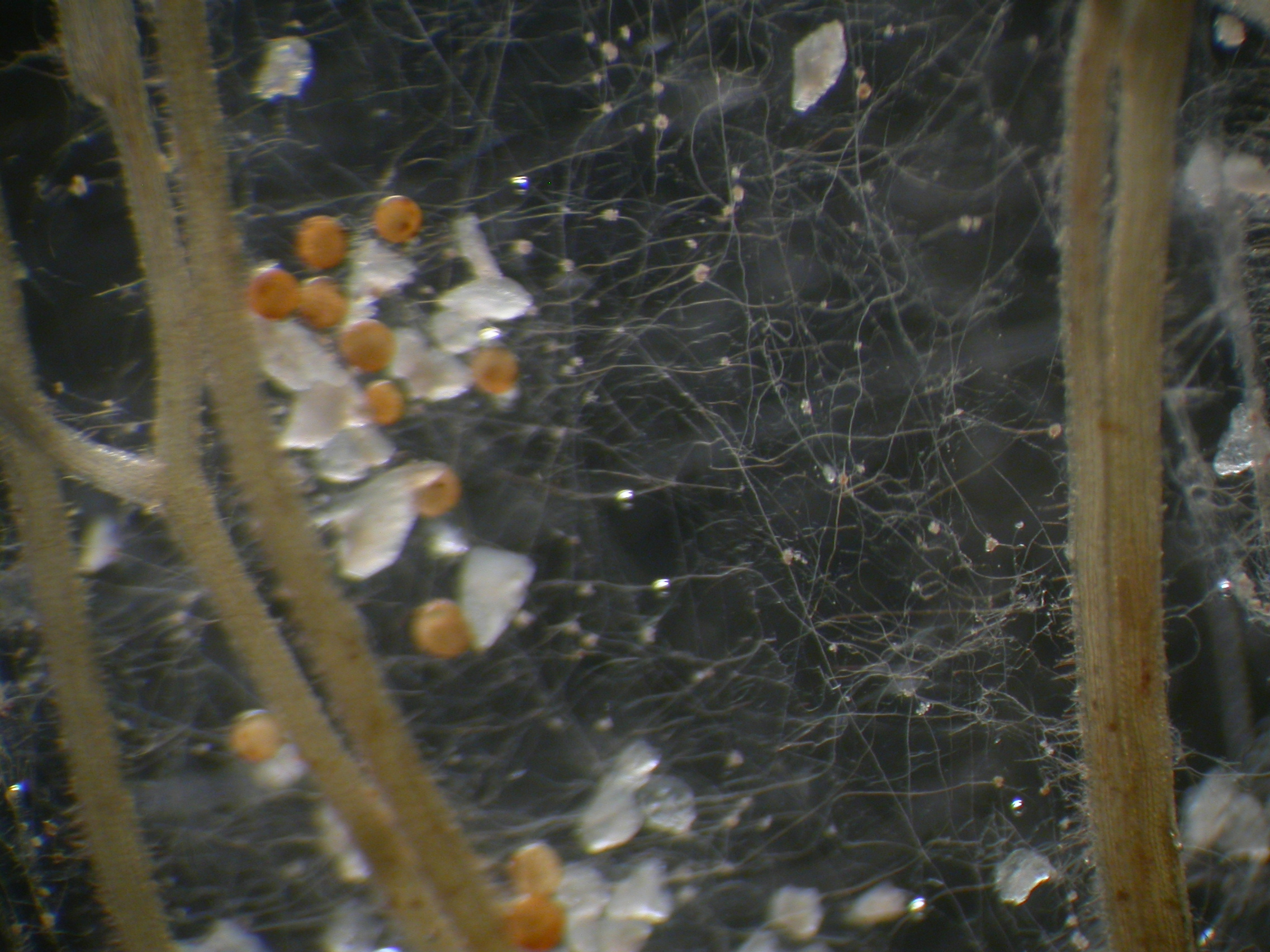

Scientific classification
- Kingdom: Fungi
- Division: Glomeromycota
- Class: Glomeromycetes
- Order: Diversisporales
- Family: Gigasporaceae
- Genus: Gigaspora
- Species: G. margarita

Binomial name
- Gigaspora margarita (W.N.) Becker & (I.R.) Hall 1976

= Gigaspora margarita =

Arbuscular Mycorrhizal Fungi

Gigaspora margarita is an Arbuscular Mycorrhizal Fungi (AMF) which means it is an obligate symbiont that creates mutualistic relationships with many different plant species. Being an AMF, G. margarita does not produce a fruiting body. All of its mycelium will be found in the soil, associating with plant roots. Though hard to distinguish between different species of AMF, microscopic distinctions can be made. A prominent morphological distinction for species in the Gigasporaceae family is their large sized spores. Gigaspora margarita is characterized by its large, white, pearl-like spores found anywhere from 260 - 400 micrometers. This is where it gets its name as margarita in Latin means pearl.

Associating with many plants, Gigaspora margarita has been found in diverse regions across the globe. In culture, G. margarita has been found to associate with onion, tomato, soy beans, corn, and clover although this list is probably a lot longer. Furthermore, G. margarita also associates with endobacteria making it a metaorganism that serves as a connection of three different kingdoms (plant, bacteria, fungus). Strains of G. margarita isolated without the endobacteria are possible indicating an asymmetric association between the fungi and the endobacteria. However these, ‘cured’ strains of G. margarita do not interact with its associated plants as well as strains with the endobacteria.

== Morphology ==
Arbuscular Mycorrhizal Fungi can be hard to distinguish since they do not produce fruiting bodies and their entire lifecycle is completed below ground. Researchers distinguish species by looking at their microscopic morphologies and genetics.

=== Mycorrhiza ===
Arbuscular Mycorrhizal Fungi are characterized by their intracellular arbuscules they form within the associated plant's roots. These arbuscules can come in many different variations with no one looking identical to another. This makes it hard for them to be used as a classification tool. Arbuscules are bush-like structures where they have branches hyphae forming from a swollen hyphal base. Oftentimes, the hyphae of AMF will stain blue using trypan blue dye.

=== Spore morphology ===
Gigaspora margarita is distinguished primarily by the morphology of its spores. Young spores are often salmon colored and will become pearly white to yellow-brown at maturity. A mature spore has three cell wall layers (L1, L2, L3):

- L1 is the outermost layer which forms the rigid and smooth shell of the spore. It is also pale brownish to yellow and is 1.6 - 2.4 micrometers thick.
- L2 is the middle layer that consists of hyaline sub-layers called laminae. These layers increase in number with maturity. The thickness of the L2 layer is highly variable even within the same spore. It can range anywhere from 14 to 23 micrometers. It also has a brown to brownish yellow tint when mounted with PVLG fluid and will turn a dark reddish brown to dark reddish purple if it is stained with Melzer's reagent.
- L3 is the innermost layer that is impossible to distinguish from the L2 layer unless the ultrastructure is looked at. Basically, the L3 layer is more electron dense than the L2 layer. The L3 layer forms warts (aka papillae) on its inner surface in clusters. These clusters are an indication of where a germ tube will form.

=== Auxiliary cells ===
Gigaspora margarita also has auxiliary cells produced on tightly wound hyphae. These cells are spikey in appearance and are found in clusters of 4-20. Auxiliary cells are found in all species classified under the Gigasporaceae family so while they do not specifically distinguish G. margarita, they are a good indicator that a certain AMF species is in the Gigasporaceae family.

== Genome ==
Gigaspora margarita has a peculiar genetic makeup as its genome consist of around 831 Mega base pairs (Mbp). This is massive compared to the usual fungal genome size that ranges from 8.97 Mb to 177.57 Mb. Furthermore, the 10 largest genomes in the kingdom of fungi belong to species that are either obligate biotrophs, endophytes, or gut fungi. This may seem like an indication that large genomes correlate with better symbiotic relationships with plants however this is not necessarily the case. The composition of the genome of G. margarita is also unique as it is primarily made up of transposable elements (64%). Fungi usually have low levels of transposable elements often only making up 0-25% of the genome. It seems the only other fungi to have large transposable element concentrations are plant pathogens which makes sense because they allow the species to adapt quickly often as a means of overcoming plant defenses. For an AMF fungus, the reasons for having such a large repertoire of transposable elements remains unclear. The genome was also found to consist of gene sequences called Helitrons. Their purpose remains unknown however these indicate that G. margarita may have captured genes from other organisms at some point in time.

== Unique features ==
=== Endobacteria symbiosis ===
Gigaspora margarita has a unique ability to associate with a diverse range of endobacteria. Though rare, the ability for Gigaspora margarita to host this intrahyphal bacteria is not completely unique. Many forms of AMF have been shown to associate with bacteria. The primary species of bacteria that associates with G. margarita is named Candidatus Glomeribacter gigasporarum (italicized?). Found in the Burkholderia genus, Ca G gigasporarum has had its entire genome sequenced and found to be a lot smaller than other Burkholderia species. This indicates a reliance on G. sporangium to survive. Ca G gigasporarum has never been found on its own in nature and, so far, can not be isolated in culture. Adding to this hypothesis is the fact that, Ca. G. gigasporarum is vertically transmitted with G. margarita spores. Each spore contains around 250,000 of these bacteria which may be a contributor to the unusually large spores G. margarita produces.

The symbiotic relationship between G. margarita and its endobacteria is asymmetric meaning one of the species can survive without the other while the other species cannot. In this case, G. margarita has been isolated and grown without the presence of endobacteria. Still, endobacteria play an important role in optimizing the relationship between the plant and the fungus. The presence of endobacteria is correlated with a higher antioxidant metabolic rate and lipid biosynthesis in the associated plant. The synthesized lipids would end up being exchanged to G. margarita. Basically, endobacteria are not required for the completion of the G. margarita life cycle however they are major contributors to the health of the interaction between plant and fungus.

== Habitat and distribution ==
Little is known about the habitat and distribution other than it seems to be widespread. G. margarita is found across the globe and has been confirmed in Brazil, USA, Canada, China, Cuba, India, Japan, Mexico, New Zealand, Poland, Syria. Most extensive research on its habitat has been conducted in Brazil where it has been found in all different biomes in the country including areas with high human traffic.

Further information needs to be collected in order to understand the preferable natural environment G. margarita inhabits.
