= Acaulospora =

Scientific classification
- Kingdom: Fungi
- Division: Glomeromycota
- Class: Glomeromycetes
- Order: Diversisporales
- Family: Acaulosporaceae
- Genus: Acaulospora

Type species
- Acaulospora laevis Gerd. & Trappe (1974)

Species
- See text

Synonyms
- Kuklospora Oehl & Sieverd (2006)

Genus of fungi

Acaulospora is a genus of fungi in the family Acaulosporaceae. Species in this genus are widespread in distribution, and form arbuscular mycorrhiza and vesicles in roots.

== Species list ==
- A. alpina
- A. appendicula
- A. bireticulata
- A. brasiliensis
- A. capsicula
- A. cavernata
- A. colliculosa
- A. colombiana
- A. colossica
- A. delicata
- A. denticulata
- A. dilatata
- A. elegans
- A. entreriana
- A. excavata
- A. foveata
- A. gedanensis
- A. gerdemannii
- A. jejuensis
- A. kentinensis
- A. koreana
- A. koskei
- A. lacunosa
- A. laevis
- A. longula
- A. mellea
- A. morrowiae
- A. myriocarpa
- A. nicolsonii
- A. nivalis
- A. paulinae
- A. polonica
- A. rehmii
- A. rugosa
- A. scrobiculata
- A. sieverdingii
- A. spinosa
- A. splendida
- A. sporocarpia
- A. taiwania
- A. terricola
- A. thomii
- A. trappei
- A. tuberculata
- A. walkeri
