= A. walkeri =

A. walkeri may refer to:

- Acaulospora walkeri, a fungus species
- Amnicola walkeri, the Canadian duskysnail, a freshwater snail species
- Amphimoea walkeri, a moth species found from Mexico south to Argentina
