= A. laevis =

A. laevis may refer to:

- Acaulospora laevis, a fungus species
- Acronychia laevis, a rainforest plant species growing in eastern Australia
- Afrixalus laevis, a frog species found in Africa
- Aipysurus laevis, a venomous sea snake species found mainly in the Indo-Pacific
- Alsodes laevis, a frog species endemic to Chile
- Amelanchier laevis, the smooth shadbush or Allegheny serviceberry, a small tree species
- Anisoptera laevis, a plant species found in Brunei, Indonesia, Malaysia and Singapore

== See also ==
- List of Latin and Greek words commonly used in systematic names#L
