= Ambispora granatensis =

Scientific classification
- Kingdom: Fungi
- Division: Glomeromycota
- Class: Glomeromycetes
- Order: Archaeosporales
- Family: Ambisporaceae
- Genus: Ambispora
- Species: A. granatensis

Binomial name
- Ambispora granatensis Palenz., N. Ferrol & Oehl 2010

Species of fungus

Ambispora granatensis is an arbuscular mycorrhizal fungal species in the genus Ambispora, family Ambisporaceae. It forms spores of the acaulosporois and glomoid morphs, thus the Ambispora classification. It was discovered in Granada Spain in 2010 and has unique spore characteristics, which distinguishes the species from the others in its genus.

== Taxonomy ==
The genus Ambispora is the only genus of the Ambisporaceae family. Species in this genus are characterized by having the potential for spore dimorphism (glomoid and acaulosporoid).

The Ambisporaceae family is separated from the other families in the Archaeosporales order due to differences in the rDNA characteristics.

== Morphology ==
The species is found to form spores of the acaulosporoid and glomoid morphs, which explains the classification under the genus Ambispora. Like the other species in the genus, this species has two spore types.

A unique characteristic of only this species, differentiating it from the others in its genus, is the spores form three walls rather than the commonly seen four-wall structure. They have a "papillae-like" rough outer cell wall surface that can be difficult to identify within a few hours of development however, when placed in water it becomes more clear. Both spore types tend to be smaller in size, having a diameter of around 90–150 μm. They are the commonly seen color of the acaulosporoid morph, ranging from glassy translucent to white or even pale yellow.

Glomoid spores are formed either in a small cluster of 2-10 or one single spore alone. The acaulosporoid spores form individually in the soil on a short pedicel that is branched off of the neck of a soporiferous saccule. The species spores can be differentiated from the other species of the genus due to its thin outer wall.

== Ecology ==
The species is known to invade plant root cells and surrounding soil to hold a symbiotic relationship with the plant it is colonizing. The species has hyphal elements and forms a vesicular Arbuscular mycorrhizal structure to facilitate the symbiotic relationship. Fungal symbiotic relationships play an important role in maintaining plant diversity and development, especially in unstable environments.

== Habitat and distribution ==
The species was isolated to garden asparagus, (Asparagus officinalis), which is multi-annually cultivated, the lifecycle and harvest schedule may explain the abundance and consistency of ambispora granatensis spore formation. In studies, the species was propagated in pot cultures with red clover (Trifolium pratense) and great millet (Sorghum vulgare).

The species was observed growing in the rhizosphere of the plant, forming a symbiotic relationship that is known to improve the growth and yield under a variety of conditions.

Arbuscular mycorrhiza (AM) species, like ambispora granatensis, are significantly affected by soil characteristics including nitrogen, clay, cation exchange capacity, and the pH of the soil, determining the species distribution. Ambispora species are the most abundant and have the highest diversity at high altitudes.

The species was originally found in an agricultural site in Granada, Spain. Granada is located on the Genil River at the base of the Sierra Nevada Mountains, it has a very hot and humid summer season with increased rainfall before and after, and a mild winter. This provides an ideal habitat for the species and allows for maximum spore production and abundance.
