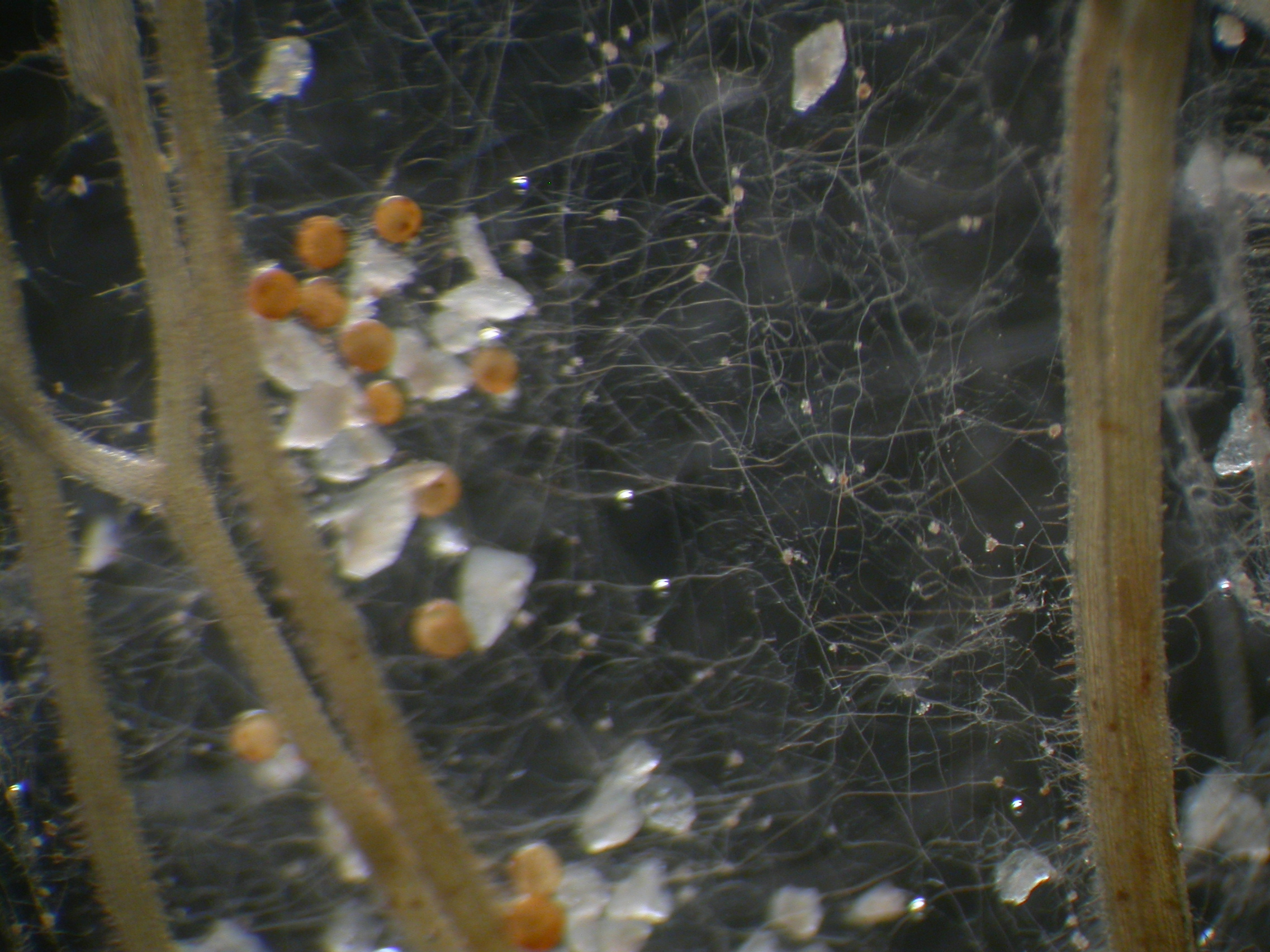
- Gigaspora margarita

Scientific classification
- Kingdom: Fungi
- Division: Glomeromycota
- Class: Glomeromycetes
- Order: Diversisporales
- Family: Gigasporaceae; J.B. Morton & Benny

Type genus
- Gigaspora Gerd. & Trappe

Genera
- Cetraspora: Cetraspora helvetica; Dentiscutata; Gigaspora: Gigaspora albida; Gigaspora decipiens; Gigaspora gigantea; Gigaspora margarita; Gigaspora rosea; Quatunica; Paradentiscutata: Paradentiscutata baiana; Paradentiscutata maritima; Racocetra: Racocetra castanea; Racocetra coralloidea; Racocetra fulgida; Racocetra gregaria; Racocetra persica; Racocetra verrucosa; Racocetra weresubiae; Scutellospora: Scutellospora biornata; Scutellospora calospora; Scutellospora cerradensis; Scutellospora dipurpurascens; Scutellospora erythropus; Scutellospora gilmorei; Scutellospora heterogama; Scutellospora nigra; Scutellospora nodosa; Scutellospora pellucida; Scutellospora reticulata; Scutellospora rubra; Scutellospora scutata

= Gigasporaceae =

Family of fungi

The Gigasporaceae are a family of fungi in the order Diversisporales. Species in this family are widespread in distribution, and form arbuscular mycorrhiza in roots.

A species under Gigasporaceae is Gigaspora gigantea. The spores of G. gigantea, found in specific sand dunes, commence in a healthy state of newly formed spores to dead and blackened in seven months through four identifiable steps: they begin as healthy greenish-yellow spores, turn into yellow with brown spots, then reddish-orange-brown, and ultimately dead. A cause of the symptoms of death in spores are soil organisms such as bacteria, protists, and microfauna.
