= Paraglomerales =

Scientific classification
- Domain: Eukaryota
- Kingdom: Fungi
- Division: Glomeromycota
- Class: Glomeromycetes
- Order: Paraglomerales; C. Walker & A. Schuessler, 2001

Order of fungi

The Paraglomerales are a group of exclusively hypogeous (underground) arbuscular mycorrhizal fungi that rarely produce vesicles and reproduce through unpigmented spores. It includes the species Paraglomus brasilianum, Paraglomus laccatum, and Paraglomus occultum.
