= Archaeosporales =

Scientific classification
- Kingdom: Fungi
- Division: Glomeromycota
- Class: Glomeromycetes
- Order: Archaeosporales; C.Walker & A.Schüßler (2004)

Families
- Ambisporaceae: Ambispora; Ambispora appendicula; Ambispora callosa; Ambispora fennica; Ambispora gerdemannii; Ambispora granatensis; Ambispora leptoticha; Archaeosporaceae: Archaeospora; Archaeospora gerdemannii; Archaeospora leptoticha; Archaeospora schenckii; Archaeospora trappei; Geosiphonaceae: Geosiphon; Geosiphon pyriformis

Order of fungi

Archaeosporales is an order of fungi best known as arbuscular mycorrhiza to vascular land plants (Tracheophyta). But also form free living endocyte symbioses with cyanobacteria. The free living forms may have a Precambrian fossil record back 2.2 Ga, well before evolution of Tracheophyta. However, the earliest fossils of Opisthokonta otherwise date back to the early Tonian, thus making this possibility questionable.
