= Pacispora =

Scientific classification
- Kingdom: Fungi
- Division: Glomeromycota
- Class: Glomeromycetes
- Order: Diversisporales
- Family: Pacisporaceae; C.Walker, Blaszk., A.Schüßler & Schwarzott
- Genus: Pacispora; Oehl & E. Sieverd.

Species
- Pacispora chimonobambusae; Pacispora patagonica; Pacispora scintillans

Family of fungi

The Pacisporaceae are a family of fungi in the order Diversisporales. The family contains the single genus Pacispora. Species in this genus are widespread in distribution, and form arbuscular mycorrhiza and vesicles in roots.
