= Diversisporaceae =

Scientific classification
- Kingdom: Fungi
- Division: Glomeromycota
- Class: Glomeromycetes
- Order: Diversisporales
- Family: Diversisporaceae; C.Walker & A.Schüssler (2004)

Genera
- Diversispora: Diversispora aurantia; Diversispora celata; Diversispora eburnea; Diversispora epigaea; Diversispora omaniana; Diversispora spurca; Diversispora trimurales; Redeckera: Redeckera fulva; Redeckera megalocarpa; Redeckera pulvinata

Family of fungi

The Diversisporaceae are a family of fungi in the order Diversisporales. These fungi form arbuscular mycorrhiza and vesicles in roots.
