= Otopetrin family =

Protein family

Otopetrin
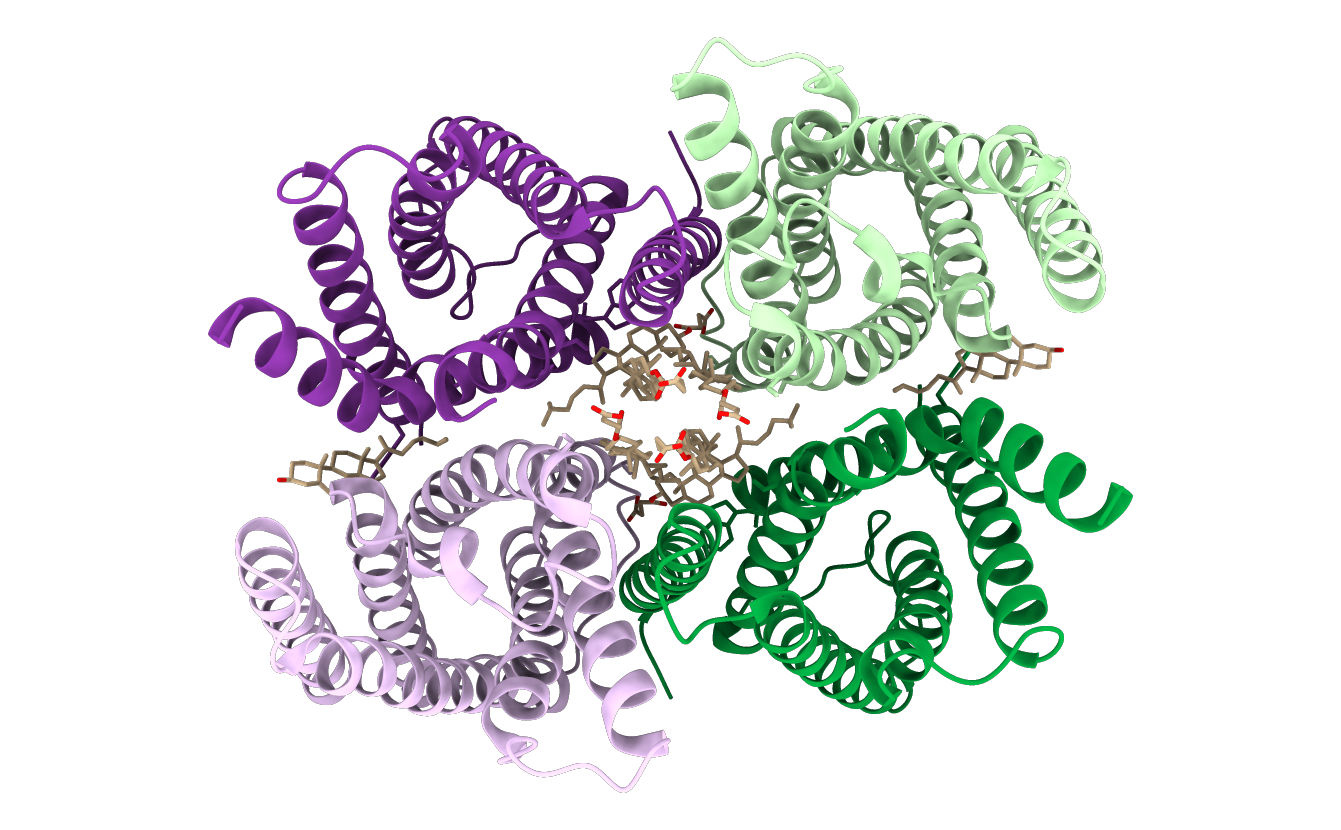
- Top-view of cartoon and stick model of zebrafish Otop1 dimer structure. PDB: 6NF4

Identifiers
- Symbol: Otopetrin
- Pfam: PF03189
- InterPro: IPR004878
- TCDB: 1.A.110
- OPM superfamily: 545
- OPM protein: 6o84
Available protein structures:
- PDB: 6NF4, 6NF6 IPR004878 PF03189 (ECOD; PDBsum)
- AlphaFold: IPR004878; PF03189

The otopetrin family is a group of proteins that were first identified based on their essential role in the vestibular system, and were later shown to form proton-selective ion channels expressed in many different tissues, including taste receptor cells. They are named after the Greek word "o̱tós," which means ear and "pétrā," which means rock, in reference to their role in the formation of otoconia/otoliths in the inner ear.

The structure of otopetrin-1 (OTOP1) was predicted to include 12 transmembrane domains, with three conserved sub-domains (OD-1 to OD-III). Recently the structures of OTOP1 and OTOP3 were solved by CryoEM, which showed that the protein assembles as a dimer. The first six transmembrane domains (N-terminal domain) and the second six transmembrane domains (C-terminal) share structural similarity, such that the assembled channel adopts a pseudotetrameric stoichiometry. A permeation pathway for ions is not clear in the solved structures, which show that the central cavity is filled with lipids. Molecular dynamic simulations show that protons may permeate the channel through the N terminal domain, C terminal domain, or the interface of the two domains.

Otopetrins were initially thought to modulate calcium homeostasis and influx of calcium in response to extracellular ATP but were subsequently shown to form proton-selective ion channels.

Otopetrin 1 (OTOP1) is required for normal formation of otoconia/otoliths in the inner ear. Otoconia are minute biomineral particles embedded in a gelatinous membrane that overlies the sensory epithelium in the inner ear. Gravity and acceleration cause the octoconia to deflect the stereocilia of sensory hair cells. Otoconia are required for processing of information regarding spatial orientation and acceleration.

OTOP1 was identified as a candidate for the sour receptor in mice in 2018 and its function as a sour receptor was confirmed in subsequent studies. Despite serving as a sour taste receptor, OTOP1 is not essential for mice to respond to and avoid sour tastes.

Many birds have a different version of OTOP1 from mammals, which is thought to be linked to their increased tolerance for sour tasting fruits and berries.
