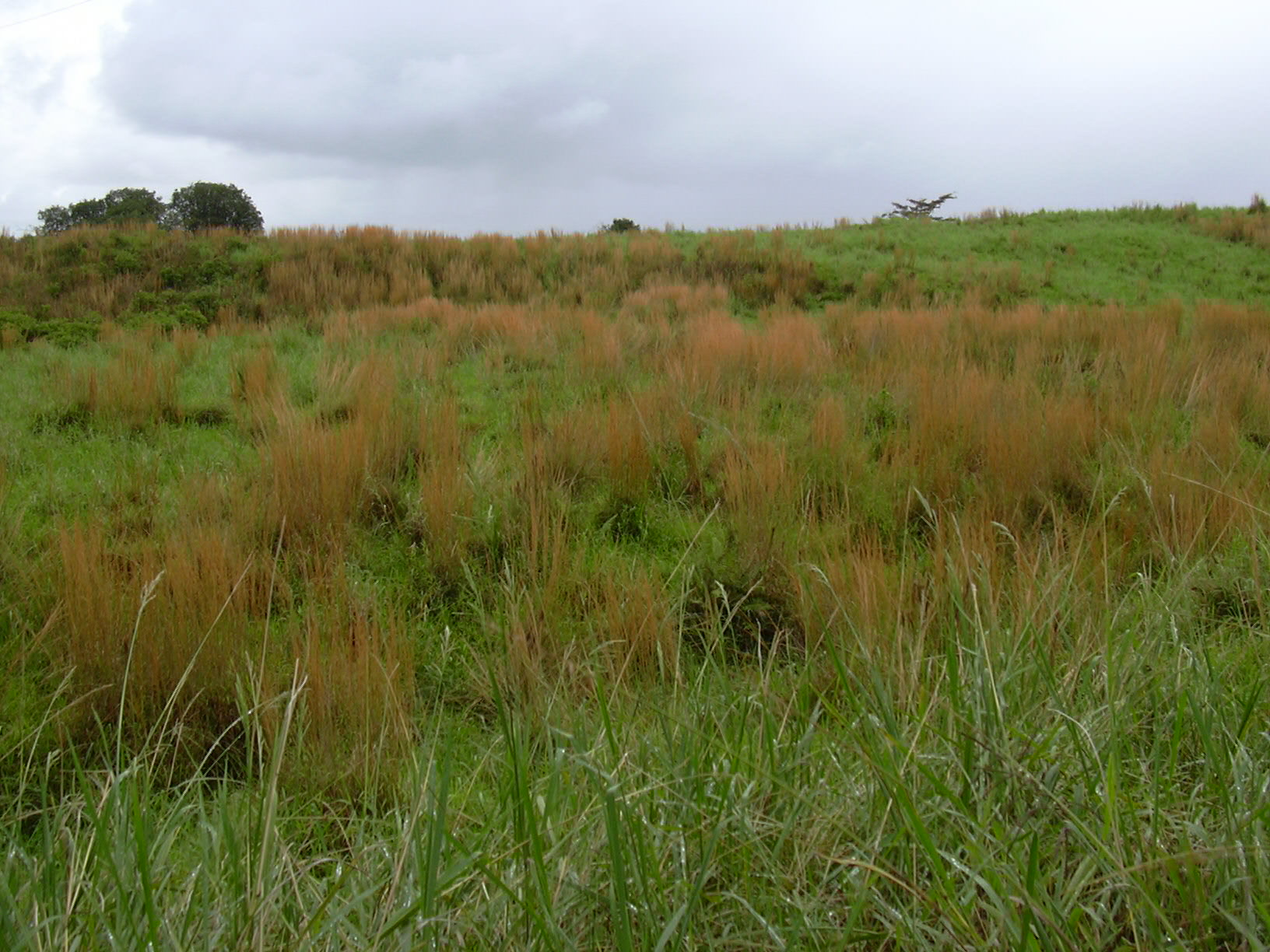

Conservation status
- Least Concern (IUCN 3.1)

Scientific classification
- Kingdom: Plantae
- Clade: Tracheophytes
- Clade: Angiosperms
- Clade: Monocots
- Clade: Commelinids
- Order: Poales
- Family: Poaceae
- Subfamily: Panicoideae
- Genus: Andropogon
- Species: A. virginicus

Binomial name
- Andropogon virginicus L.

= Andropogon virginicus =

Species of plant

Andropogon virginicus is a species of grass known by several common names, including broomsedge bluestem, yellowsedge bluestem and (in Australia, because it was introduced to that country after being used as packaging for bottles of American whiskey) whiskey grass. It is native to the southeastern United States and as far north as the Great Lakes. It is known as an introduced species in California and Hawaii, where it is weedy.

== Description ==
Andropogon virginicus is a slender bunchgrass with an upright and vase shaped habit. It has very dense fibrous roots. Leaves are medium green and erect. Leaves are linear and about 1/4 inch (0.64 cm) wide. The culms have bristle tipped spikelets, most visible in the summer and fall.

== Distribution ==
Andropogon virginicus is native in the lower forty-eight states, as well as Puerto Rico and Canada. This plant species was introduced into Hawaii as well as California, Japan, New Zealand and other areas. It is also considered native to the Bahamas, Belize, Costa Rica, Cuba, Dominican Republic, Guatemala, Haiti, Honduras, Jamaica, Mexico, Nicaragua, Panamá, Puerto Rico, Trinidad-Tobago, and Venezuela.

== Uses ==
Andropogon virgincus is typically used for erosion control, rain gardens, and stormwater management. This grass is very drought tolerant, can survive infertile soils, and is adaptable to sites where grading and construction is heavy. This bunchgrass provides nesting material and cover specifically for quail, turkeys, and other birds. It is not considered important for cattle forage. Still it provides some livestock and wildlife grazing opportunities in spring and early summer. Small birds use broomsedge seeds in the winter when other food is limited. It is a larval host for Poanes zabulon, the Skipper butterfly. Andropogon virgincus can be used as an ornamental plant. Since it requires little water to survive, many golf courses use it for landscaping, as it also adds color to landscapes. Andropogon virginicus has been used as the straw base for the production of handmade brooms in the southeastern United States.

== Weed status ==
Andropogon virginicus can be problematic in pastures. Without proper herbicide applications, pasture management is nearly impossible with this type of weed. This broomsedge bunchgrass is typically low in nutrients, so it is generally not browsed by deer or livestock, unless new growth is present. Farmers consider this grass to be a indicator of poor soil. Andropogon virginicus is referred to as whiskey grass in places where this weed is unwanted. This species often invades open woodlands, grasslands, and forests areas. Where it is invasive, A. virginicus is known to invade plant communities that are extremely deficient in nutrients. In Queensland, Australia, Andropogon virginicus is ranked among the top 200 most invasive plant species in that region. Where it is invasive, it can be very common and dominates roadsides, and can also form continuous cover in boggy, mesic, and dry habitats in the USA.

== Etymology ==
Andropogon comes from the Greek word andros, which equals the word man, and pogon equals the word beard. This is derived from the assumption that the hairy spikelets characteristic of the genus are said to look very similar to that of a man's beard. The Swedish botanist Carl Linnaeus named this species virginicus derived from the Latin meaning "from Virginia". Virginia was the territory where the first specimen of Andropogon virginicus was collected.

== Conservation status ==
According to the IUCN Red List of Threatened Species, Andropogon virginicus, is considered of least concern in regards of becoming a threatened species. It is also considered increasing in population.

== Similar species ==
Andropogon virginicus is similar to and often misinterpreted for other grasses. The species it is often misinterpreted in Australia for a native grass, Schizachyrium fragile, this grass has seed-head branches born singly instead of in pairs. Another Australian species that broomsedge can be misinterpreted for is grader grass, Themeda quadrivalvis, and kangaroo grass, Themeda triandra. These species, both have flower spikelets arranged in drooping triangular shaped clusters, and large twisted awns.

== Fire ecology ==
Andropogon virginicus is very adaptable and tolerant to fires. The dryness of this plant species makes it significantly flammable. After fire, broomsedge has the ability to quickly regenerate from its root system. The time of the year also affects how Andropogon virginicus reacts and how quickly it is able to regain its growth and maturity. Burning in November after an October frost decreased broomsedge stem density by more than 47%. Broomsedge control can be conducted by herbicides, but control may be short-lived due to recruitment by seed.

== Invasive species ==
Andropogon virginicus has been introduced to Japan and Australia. It competes with other species by allelopathy, releasing persistent herbicidal chemicals from its dying tissues, such as decaying leaves. Andropogon virginicus colonizes disturbed areas such as abandoned mining sites. It is a weed of pastures and grazing ranges, where it proves less palatable and nutritious to cattle than other grasses. This species is tolerant of fire and grows back quickly and more abundantly after a burn. It is problematic in Hawaii, it is dormant during the Hawaiian rainy season, dying back and leaving the slopes it has colonized exposed and vulnerable to significant erosion. Despite its weediness, the grass is sometimes grown as an ornamental plant. The species is considered invasive in New Caledonia.

The species is featured on the list of Invasive Alien Species of Union Concern. This means that import of the species and trade is forbidden in the European Union.

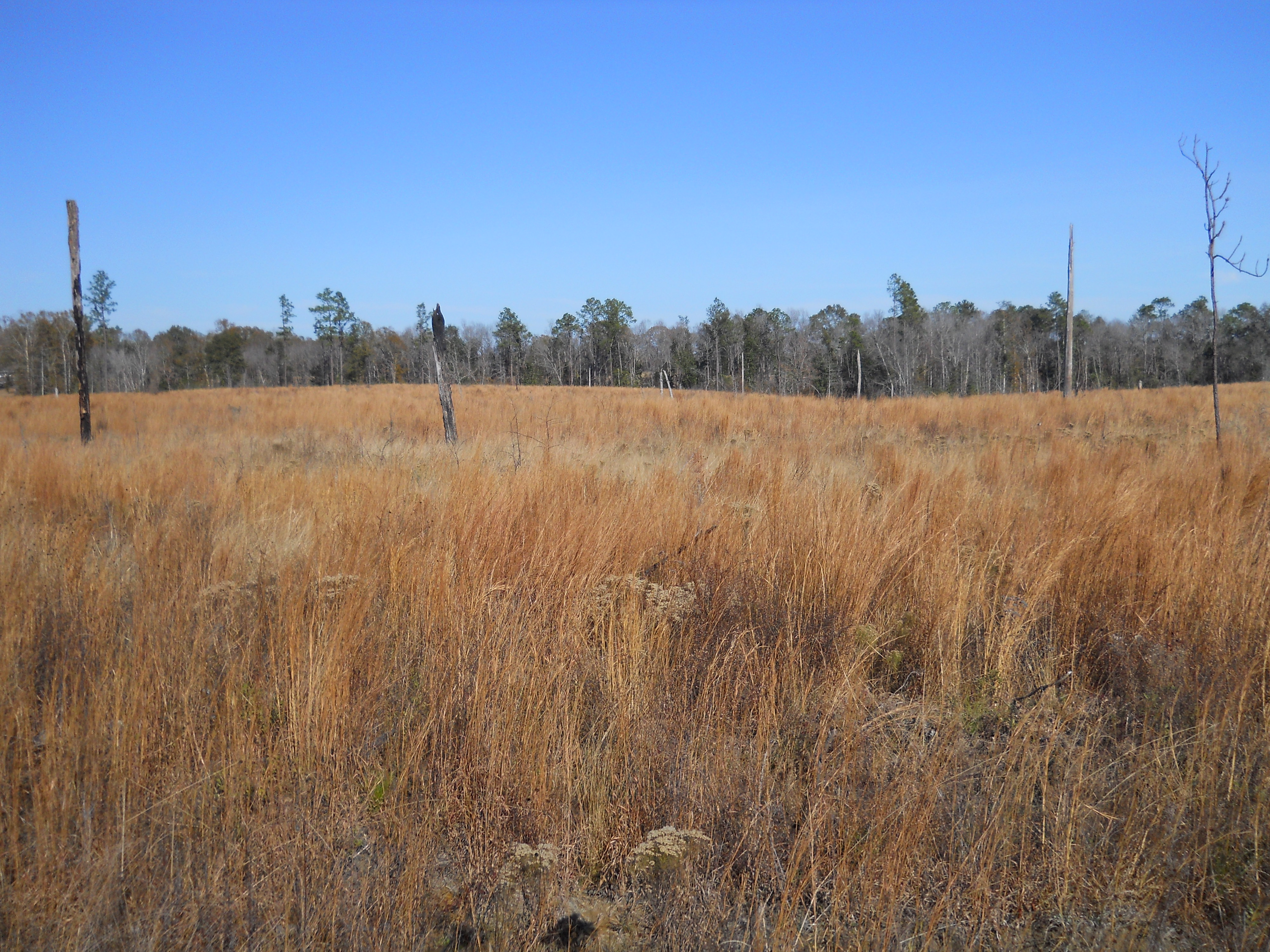
Typical appearance of broomsedge in winter (Stone County, Mississippi, 2010)

== Life history ==
Andropogon virginicus is a perennial grass forming narrow clumps of stems up to just over a meter in maximum height (around 3 feet 3 inches). Its stems and leaves are green when new, turning purplish to orange and then straw-colored with age. It produces large amounts of seeds small enough to disperse on the wind. This grass is successful in a wide range of habitats. It is a prolific seed producer, it has a high germination rate and seedling survival rate, and it thrives in poor soils.
