= Acaulosporaceae =

Scientific classification
- Kingdom: Fungi
- Division: Glomeromycota
- Class: Glomeromycetes
- Order: Diversisporales
- Family: Acaulosporaceae; J.B.Morton & Benny (1990)

Type genus
- Acaulospora Gerdemann & Trappe (1974)

Genera
- Acaulospora; Entrophospora

Family of fungi

The Acaulosporaceae are a family of fungi in the order Diversisporales. Species in this family are widespread in distribution, and form arbuscular mycorrhiza and vesicles in roots. The family contains two genera and 31 species.
