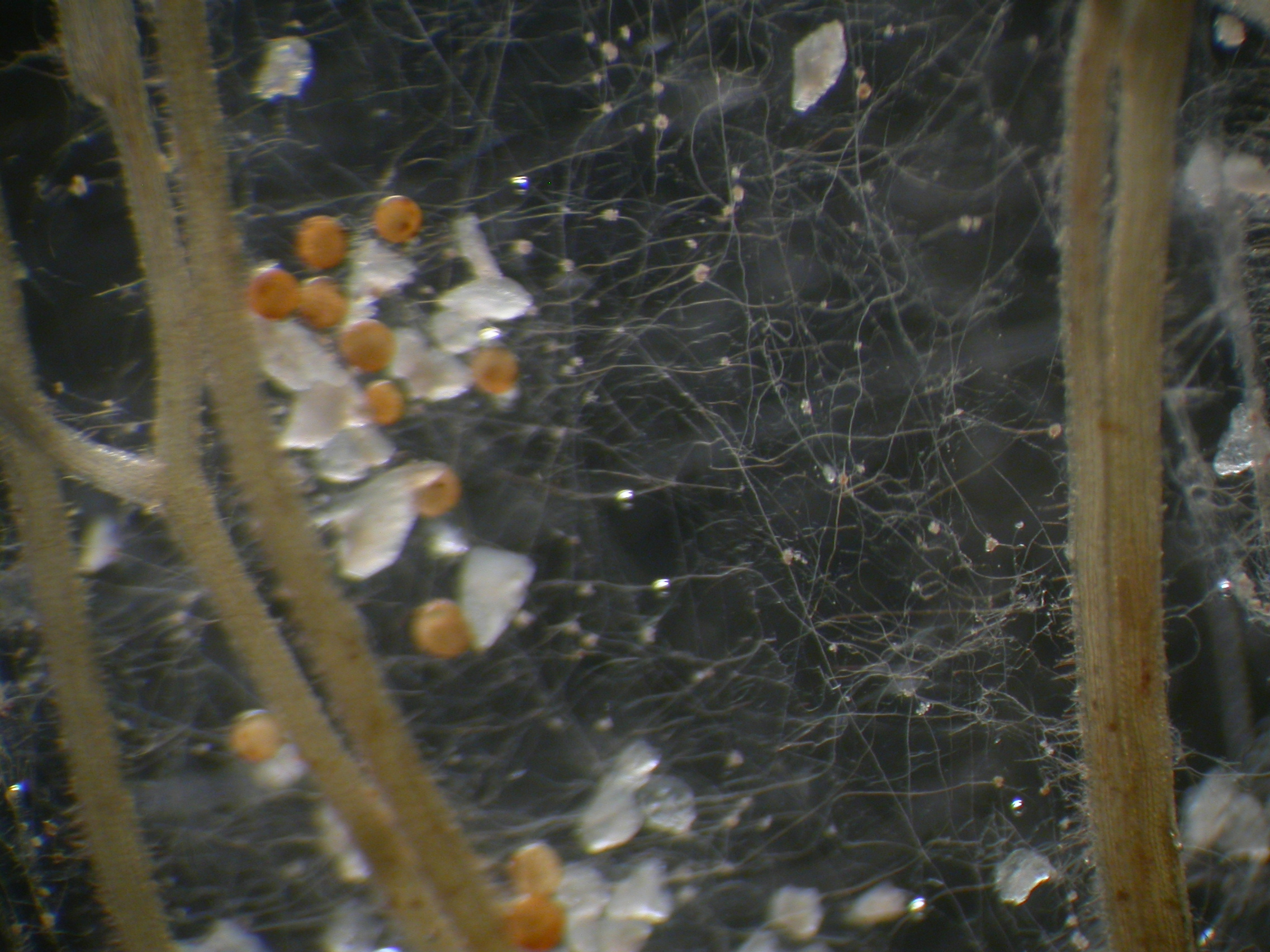

Scientific classification
- Domain: Eukaryota
- Kingdom: Fungi
- Division: Glomeromycota
- Class: Glomeromycetes
- Order: Diversisporales; C.Walker & A.Schüßler (2004)

Families
- Acaulosporaceae; Diversisporaceae; Gigasporaceae; Pacisporaceae

= Diversisporales =

Order of fungi

The Diversisporales are an order of generally hypogeous (underground) arbuscular mycorrhizal fungi within the division Glomeromycota. Many have vesicles for energy storage, or auxiliary cells. Species produce a wide range of spore types, hence the name.
