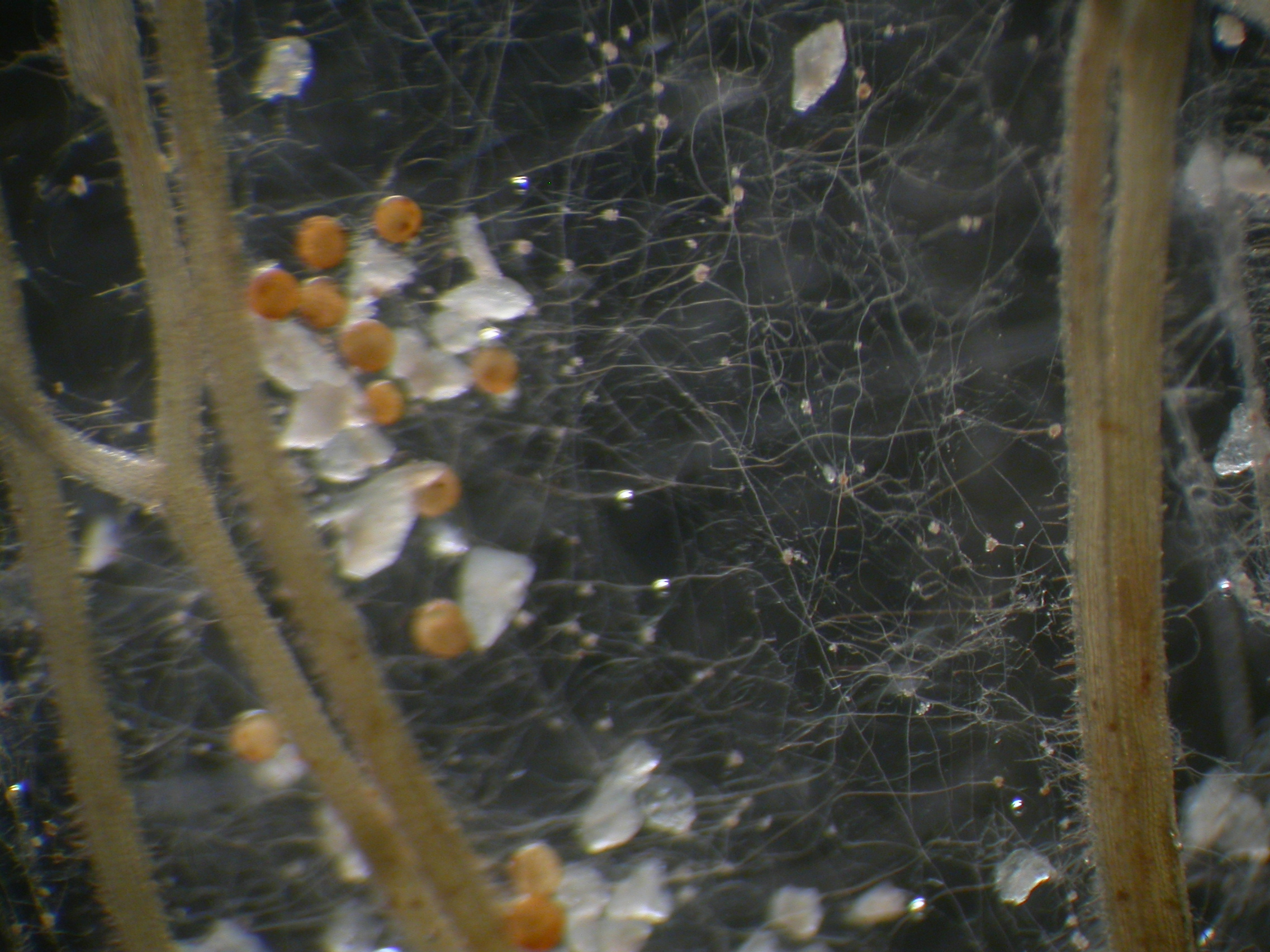
- Gigaspora margarita in association with Lotus corniculatus

Scientific classification
- Kingdom: Fungi
- Division: Glomeromycota
- Subdivision: Glomeromycotina; C.Walker & A.Schuessler (2001)
- Class: Glomeromycetes; Caval.-Sm. (1998)

Orders
- Archaeosporales; Diversisporales; Glomerales; Paraglomerales; †Nematophytales?

= Glomeromycota =

Phylum of fungi

Glomeromycota (often referred to as glomeromycetes, as they include only one class, Glomeromycetes) are one of eight currently recognized divisions within the kingdom Fungi, with approximately 230 described species. Members of the Glomeromycota form arbuscular mycorrhizas (AMs) with the thalli of bryophytes and the roots of vascular land plants. Not all species have been shown to form AMs, and one, Geosiphon pyriformis, is known not to do so. Instead, it forms an endocytobiotic association with Nostoc cyanobacteria. The majority of evidence shows that the Glomeromycota are dependent on land plants (Nostoc in the case of Geosiphon) for carbon and energy, but there is recent circumstantial evidence that some species may be able to lead an independent existence. The arbuscular mycorrhizal species are terrestrial and widely distributed in soils worldwide where they form symbioses with the roots of the majority of plant species (>80%). They can also be found in wetlands, including salt-marshes, and associated with epiphytic plants.

According to multigene phylogenetic analyses, this taxon is located as a member of the phylum Mucoromycota. Currently, the phylum name Glomeromycota is invalid, and the subphylum Glomeromycotina should be used to describe this taxon.

== Reproduction ==
The Glomeromycota have generally coenocytic (occasionally sparsely septate) mycelia and reproduce asexually through blastic development of the hyphal tip to produce spores (Glomerospores, blastospore) with diameters of 80–500 μm. In some, complex spores form within a terminal saccule. Recently it was shown that Glomus species contain 51 genes encoding all the tools necessary for meiosis. Based on these and related findings, it was suggested that Glomus species may have a cryptic sexual cycle.

== Colonization ==
New colonization of AM fungi largely depends on the amount of inoculum present in the soil. Although pre-existing hyphae and infected root fragments have been shown to colonize the roots of a host successfully, germinating spores are considered to be the key players in new host establishment. Spores are commonly dispersed by fungal and plant burrowing herbivore partners, but some air dispersal capabilities are also known. Studies have shown that spore germination is specific to particular environmental conditions such as right amount of nutrients, temperature or host availability. It has also been observed that the rate of root system colonization is directly correlated to spore density in the soil. In addition, new data also suggests that AM fungi host plants also secrete chemical factors that attract and enhance the growth of developing spore hyphae towards the root system.

The necessary components for the colonization of Glomeromycota include the host's fine root system, proper development of intracellular arbuscular structures, and a well-established external fungal mycelium. Colonization is accomplished by the interactions between germinating spore hyphae and the root hairs of the host or by the development of appressoria between epidermal root cells. The process is regulated by specialized chemical signaling and changes in gene expression of both the host and AM fungi. Intracellular hyphae extend up to the cortical cells of the root and penetrate the cell walls but not the inner cellular membrane creating an internal invagination. The penetrating hyphae develop a highly branched structure called an arbuscule, which has low functional periods before degradation and absorption by the host's root cells. A fully developed arbuscular mycorrhizal structure facilitates the two-way movement of nutrients between the host and mutualistic fungal partner. The symbiotic association allows the host plant to respond better to environmental stresses, and the non-photosynthetic fungi to obtain carbohydrates produced by photosynthesis.

== Phylogeny ==
Initial studies of the Glomeromycota were based on the morphology of soil-borne sporocarps (spore clusters) found in or near colonized plant roots. Distinguishing features such as wall morphologies, size, shape, color, hyphal attachment and reaction to staining compounds allowed a phylogeny to be constructed. Superficial similarities led to the initial placement of genus Glomus in the unrelated family Endogonaceae. Following broader reviews that cleared up the sporocarp confusion, the Glomeromycota were first proposed in the genera Acaulospora and Gigaspora before being accorded their own order with the three families Glomaceae (now Glomeraceae), Acaulosporaceae and Gigasporaceae.

With the advent of molecular techniques this classification has undergone major revision. An analysis of small subunit (SSU) rRNA sequences indicated that they share a common ancestor with the Dikarya. Nowadays it is accepted that Glomeromycota consists of 4 orders.

- Glomeromycota
  - - - Diversisporales
      - Glomerales
    - Archaeosporales
  - Paraglomerales

Several species which produce glomoid spores (i.e. spores similar to Glomus) in fact belong to other deeply divergent lineages and were placed in the orders, Paraglomerales and Archaeosporales. This new classification includes the Geosiphonaceae, which presently contains one fungus (Geosiphon pyriformis) that forms endosymbiotic associations with the cyanobacterium Nostoc punctiforme and produces spores typical to this division, in the Archaeosporales.

Work in this field is incomplete, and members of Glomus may be better suited to different genera or families.

Different Glomeromycota members
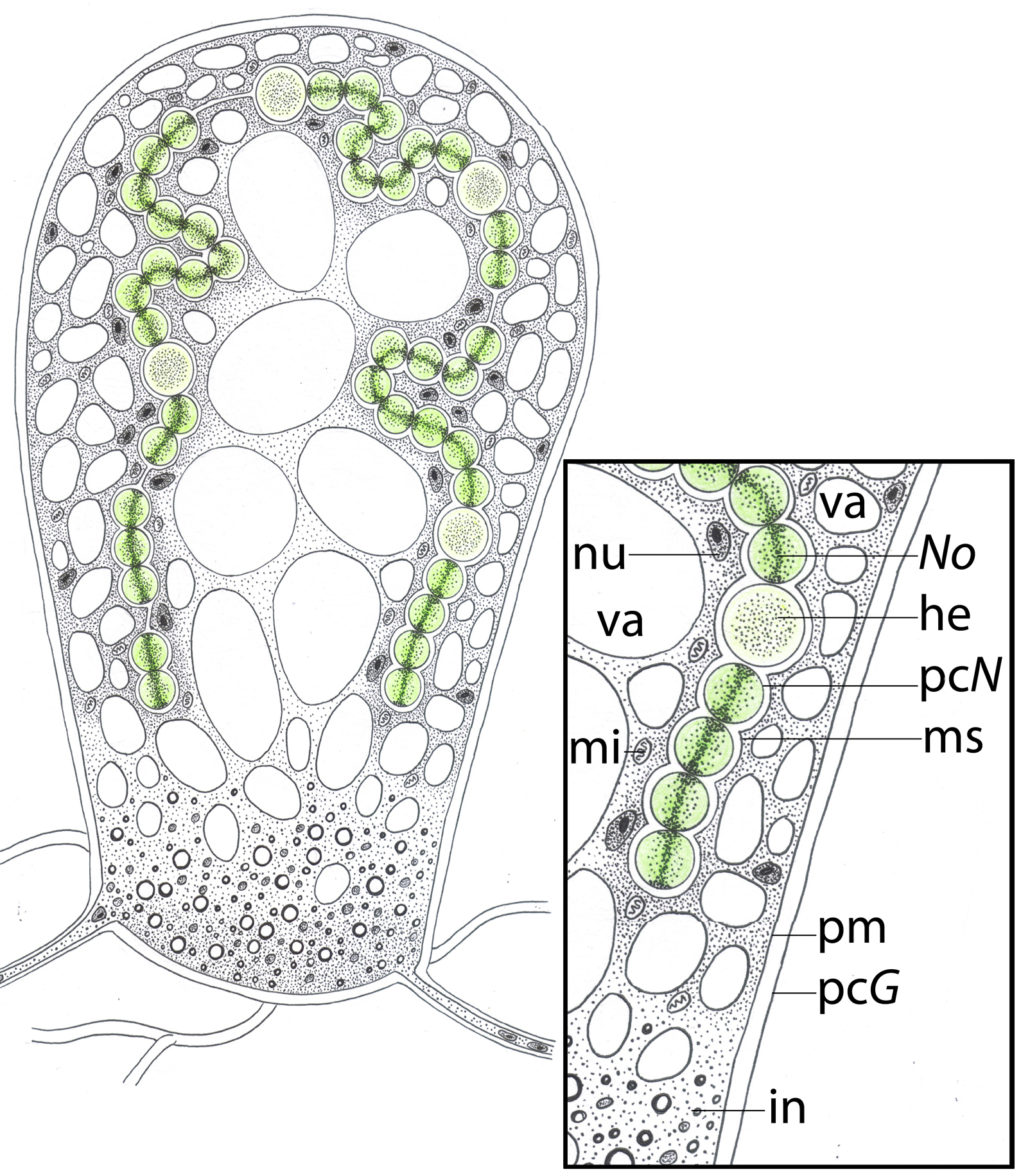
Geosiphon pyriforme, a glomeromycota member that harbors endosymbiotic cyanobacteria.

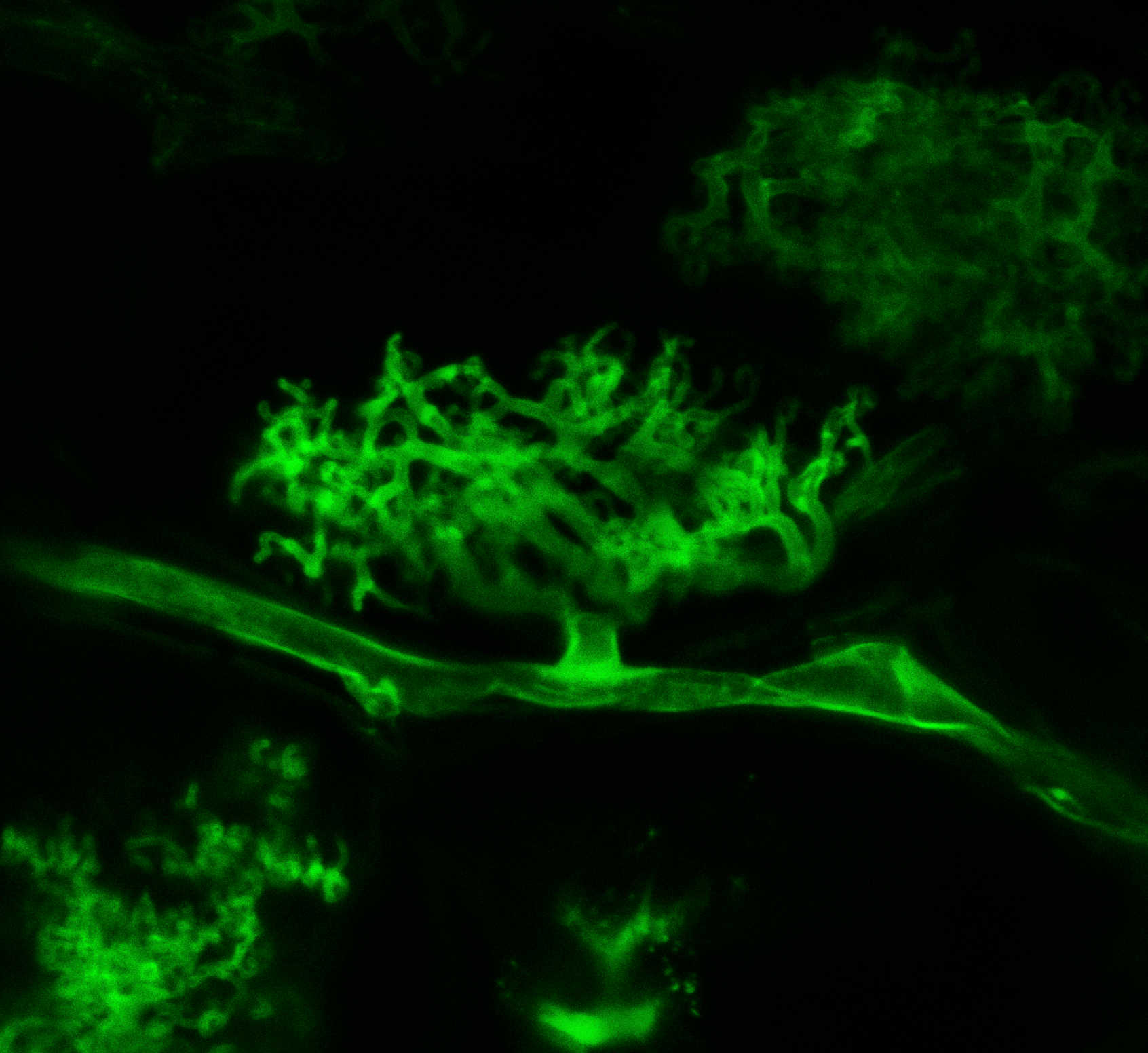
An arbuscular mycorrhizal fungus under fluorescent staining

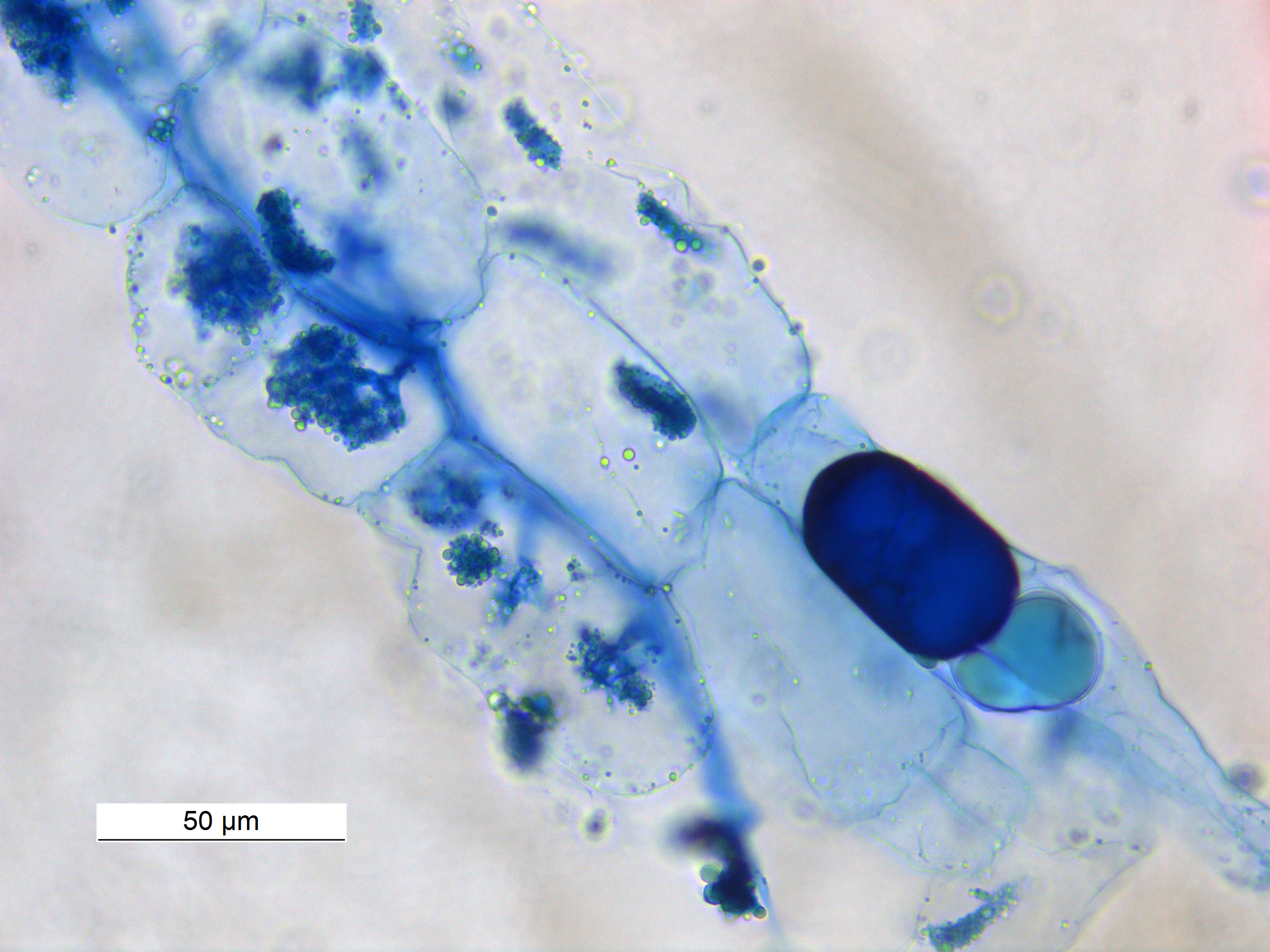
Arbuscular mycorrhizal fungi showing vesicle and arbuscles

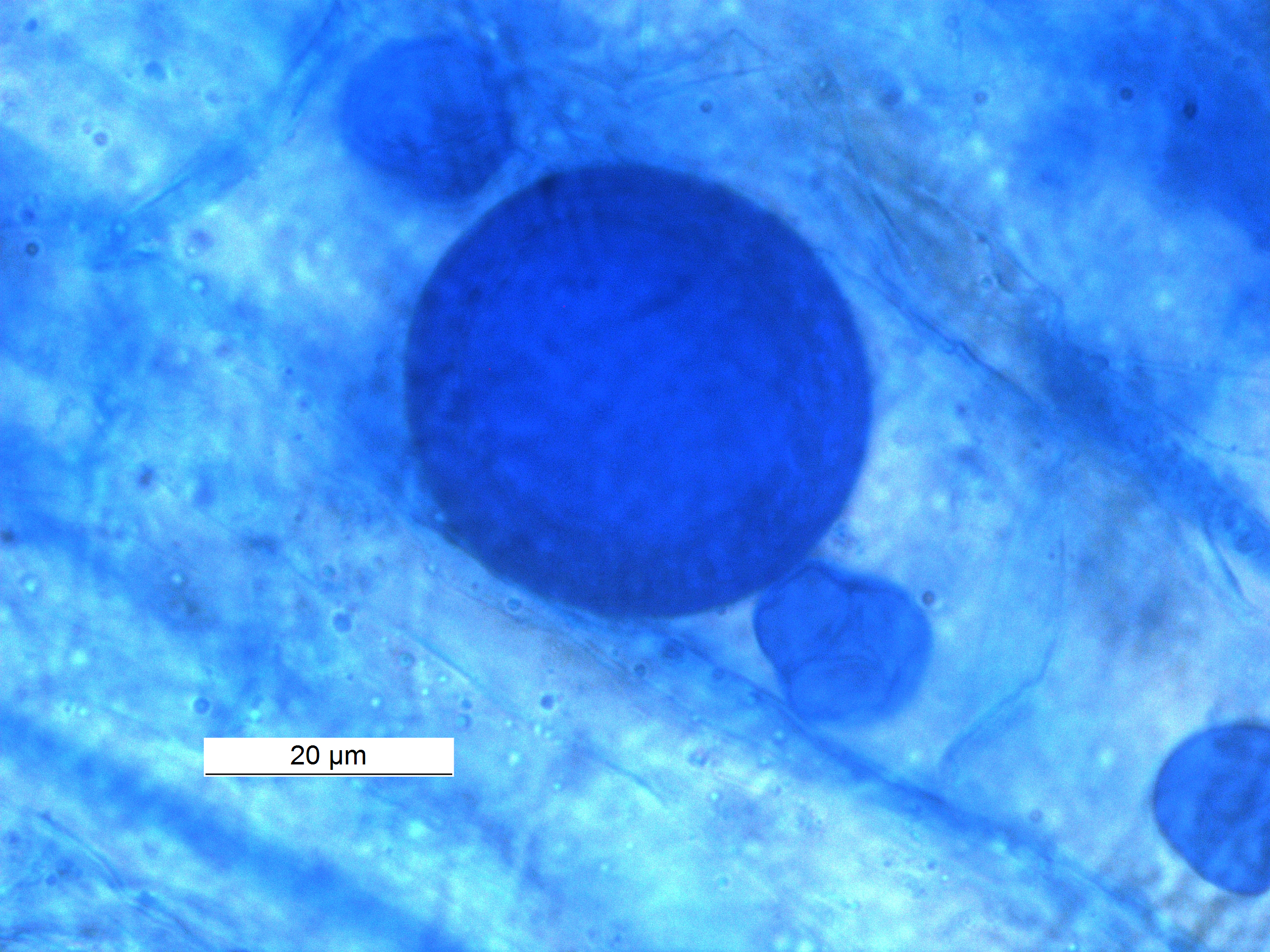
An intraradical spore of arbuscular mycorrhizal fungi

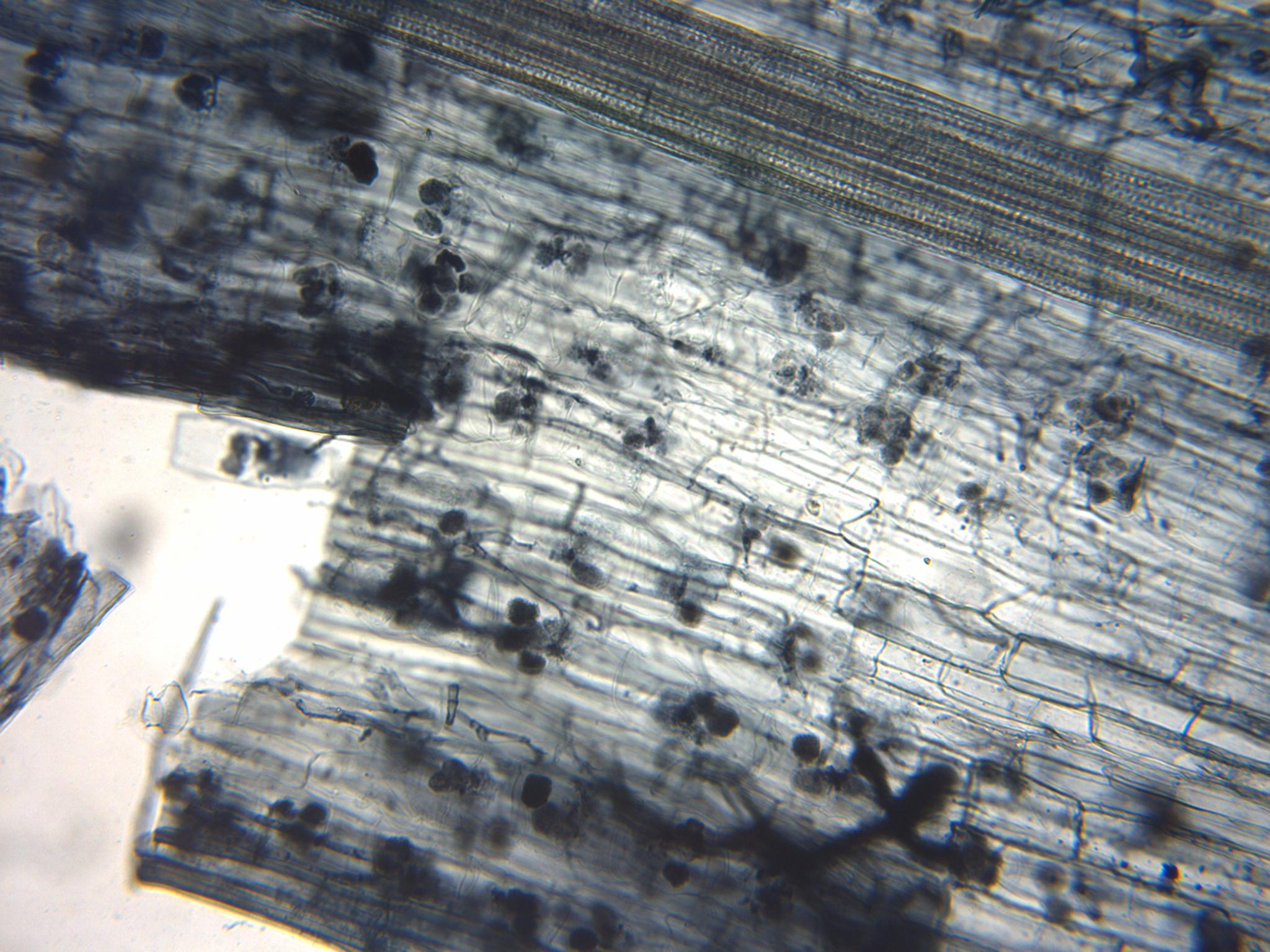
Arbuscular mycorrhizal fungus in flax root cortex

== Molecular biology ==
The biochemical and genetic characterization of the Glomeromycota has been hindered by their biotrophic nature, which impedes laboratory culturing. This obstacle was eventually surpassed with the use of root cultures and, most recently, a method which applies sequencing of single nucleus from spores has also been developed to circumvent this challenge. The first mycorrhizal gene to be sequenced was the small-subunit ribosomal RNA (SSU rRNA). This gene is highly conserved and commonly used in phylogenetic studies so was isolated from spores of each taxonomic group before amplification through the polymerase chain reaction (PCR). A metatranscriptomic survey of the Sevilleta Arid Lands found that 5.4% of the fungal rRNA reads mapped to Glomeromycota. This result was inconsistent with previous PCR-based studies of community structure in the region, suggesting that previous PCR-based studies may have underestimated Glomeromycota abundance due to amplification biases.

== See also ==
- Prototaxites
