= Glomus aggregatum =

Scientific classification
- Kingdom: Fungi
- Division: Glomeromycota
- Class: Glomeromycetes
- Order: Glomerales
- Family: Glomeraceae
- Genus: Glomus
- Species: G. aggregatum

Binomial name
- Glomus aggregatum N.C.Schenck & G.S.Sm.

Species of fungus

Glomus aggregatum is an arbuscular mycorrhizal fungus used as a soil inoculant in agriculture and horticulture. Like other species in this phylum it forms obligate symbioses with plant roots, where it obtains carbon (photosynthate) from the host plant in exchange for nutrients and other benefits.

== Morphology ==
G. aggregatum has sporocarps containing spores which are not closely grouped. Spores are usually pear-shaped or spherical and measure between 40 and 85 μm in diameter, whereas sporocarps can be 200-1800 μm X 200-1400 μm in diameter. Spore color ranges from pale yellow to a darker yellow-brown or orange-brown. Spores can be contained in either one or two cell walls, but if there are two, the outer wall is always thicker. A second type of spore wall thickening has been observed in G. aggregatum spores wherein the wall undergoes localized thickening in one hemisphere or a smaller space. This can happen in multiple locations on a single spore and can contribute to the spore having a pear-like shape. The attached hypha can be blocked from the pore by this thickening. As is the case for all species in this genus, the mycorrhizal structure of G. aggregatum proliferates in straight lines along the cortex, branching dichotomously at cell junctions as it penetrates deeper into the root and extending in two directions at once. The mycorrhizal hyphae stain dark. Arbuscules that breach into root cells are thick and intricately branched into compact hyphal bunches.

== History and Taxonomy ==
In 1939, Edwin John Butler described a Glomus aggregatum-like organism, but a name was not assigned to this species until 1943, when C.O. Rosendahl provided further details and named the species Rhizophagites butleri Rosendahl. Rosendahl wrote of his discovery of grouped (or clustered) sporangia on thick-walled, branched hyphae recovered from disturbed soils in Minnesota. Over the course of the next 40 years, various researchers were able to isolate similar fungal spores (typically in areas with sand based soils), but it wasn't until 1982 that G. aggregatum was first described. N.C. Schenck and George S. Smith were the researchers who made this discovery (in Florida Citrus groves) and their description was very similar to that of R. butleri and other fungi in the Glomus fasciculatum complex, however, it was still thought to be a different species than R. butleri. Further research was conducted, and after comparing extensive amounts of fungal spores, a conclusion was reached that G. aggregatum and R. butleri are in-fact the same species of fungi. Analyses by Schwarzott, Walker, and Schußler showed the genus was not monophyletic. The recent reorganization of the Glomeromycota phylogeny has renamed this species Rhizophagus aggregatum.

== Human Use ==
The large scale application of arbuscular mycorrhizal fungi such as G. aggregatum to human activities is its presence in commercial agriculture as an inoculum. Mycorrhizal relationships are important in this context because long-term agriculture tends to drain nutrients like phosphorus from the soil. For this reason, modern agriculture must apply vast amounts of phosphorus and other nutrients to fields yearly. Artificial and stimulated mycorrhizal associations can help plants mobilize phosphorus from the soil and utilize it. This can lead to higher yields and can also lessen the need for artificial phosphorus fertilization. It has also been suggested that selective inoculation of mycorrhiza into certain crops can increase water retention and help mitigate toxic factors in major food sources such as rice.

G. aggregatum and other members of Glomeromycota may also help in soil detoxification processes and ecosystem-level metabolic pathways. For example, an experiment in 2010 showed that root-mycorrhizal interface was significantly more successful at detoxifying arsenic-laced soils than non-associated roots. The study showed that the presence of G. aggregatum methylated the arsenic in the soil, but that indigenous soil microorganisms were responsible for further detoxification of dimethylarsinic acid into trimethylarsine oxide.
