= Palaeoglomus =

Palaeoglomus Temporal range: Middle Ordovician–Early Devonian

Scientific classification
- Kingdom: Fungi
- Division: Glomeromycota
- Class: Glomeromycetes
- Order: Glomerales
- Family: Glomeraceae
- Genus: †Palaeoglomus; Redecker et al. (2002)

Type species
- Palaeoglomus grayi Redecker et al. (2002)

Genus of fungi

Palaeoglomus ("ancient ball") is a genus of microscopic mycorrhizal fossil, found in palynological preparations of rocks which separate out organic remains by acid dissolution.

== Description ==
Palaeoglomus has large spherical to ellipsoidal spores with multilayered walls, as well as irregularly shaped vesicles, attached to aseptate hyphae.

== Species ==
Palaeoglomus grayi type species from the Middle Ordovician Guttenberg Formation near Platteville, Wisconsin.

Palaeoglomus boullardi from the Early Devonian Rhynie Chert bear Rhynie, Scotland.

Palaeoglomus strotheri from the Middle Ordovician (Darriwilian, 460 million years old) Douglas Lake Member of the Lenoir Limestone from Douglas Dam, Tennessee.

== Biological affinities ==
Palaeoglomus is similar to modern mycorrhizae such as Glomus.
