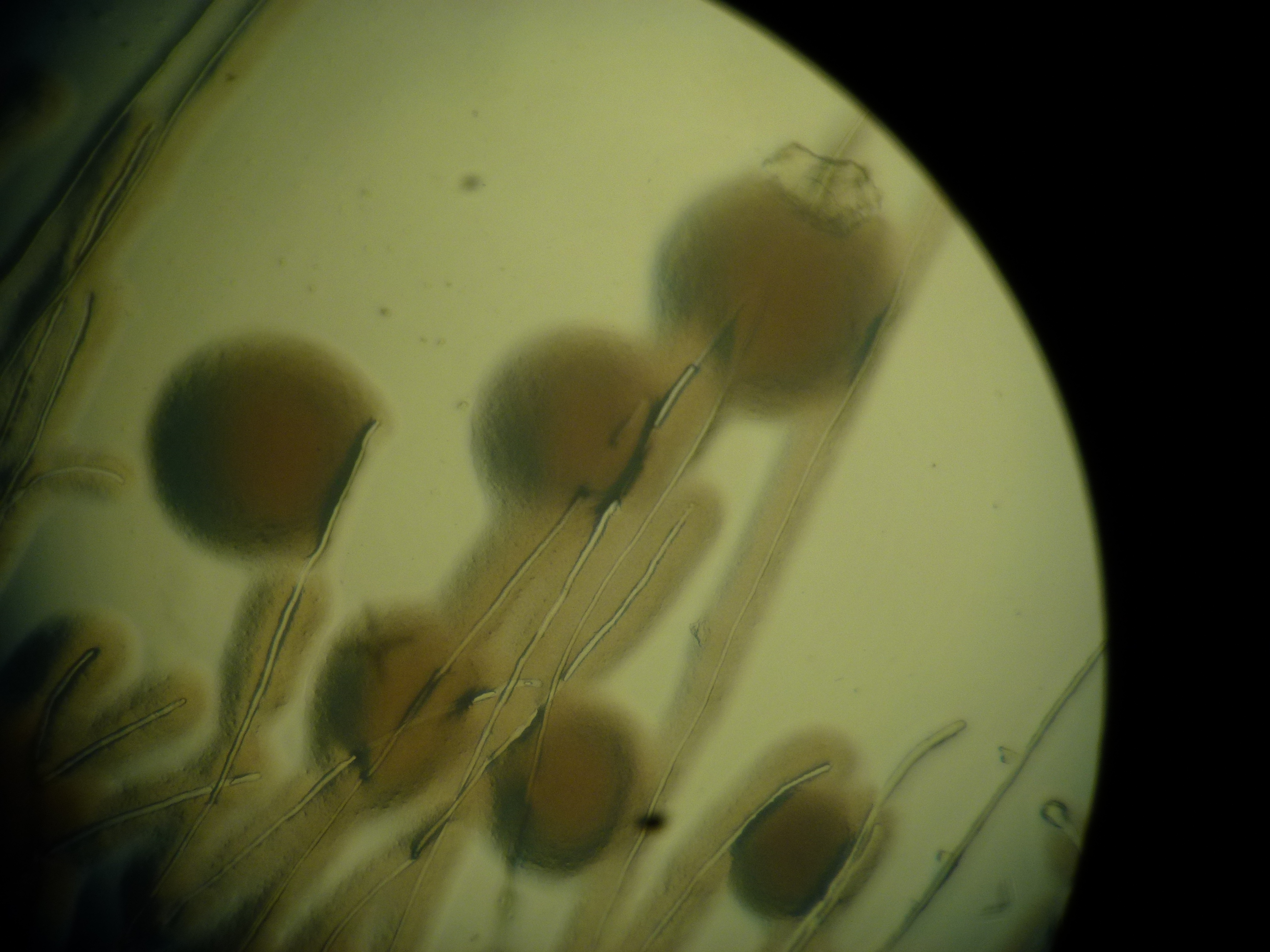
- New produced spores of Funneliformis mosseae in a dual culture with tomato on MM medium

Scientific classification
- Kingdom: Fungi
- Division: Glomeromycota
- Class: Glomeromycetes
- Order: Glomerales
- Family: Glomeraceae
- Genus: Funneliformis
- Species: F. mosseae

Binomial name
- Funneliformis mosseae (T.H. Nicolson & Gerd.) C. Walker & A. Schüßler

Synonyms
- Glomus mosseae; Endogone mosseae

= Funneliformis mosseae =

Species of fungus

Funneliformis mosseae is a species of fungus in the family Glomeraceae, which is an arbuscular mycorrhizal (AM) fungi that forms symbiotic relationships with plant roots. Funneliformis mosseae has a wide distribution worldwide, and can be found in North America, South America, Europe, Africa, Asia and Australia. Funneliformis are characterized by having an easily visible septum in the area of the spore base and are often cylindrical or funnel-shaped. Funneliformis mosseae similarly resembles Glomus caledonium, however the spore wall of Funneliformis mosseae contains three layers, whereas Gl. caledonium spore walls are composed of four layers. Funneliformis is an easily cultivated species which multiplies well in trap culture, along with its high distribution, F. mosseae is not considered endangered and is often used for experimental purposes when combined with another host.

== Morphology ==
The morphology of Funneliformis mosseae can be varied depending on location and generation.

=== Spore structure ===
The spores of Funneliformis mosseae are yellow to golden yellow in color and are globose or subglobose (80-)185(−280) μm diameter, with one subtending hypha. The spore wall is made up of three layers all with distinct phenotypes. The first layer is hyaline and mucilogenous and is approximately 1.4–2.5 μm thick (mean = 2.1 μm). This layer is found in the juvenile spores of F. mosseae, and degrades as the spore matures and goes through sloughing, producing a granular appearance. The second layer of the spore wall is also hyaline and is a thickness of 0.8–1.6 μm thick (mean = 1.2 μm). This layer is often observed as sliver-like or partially decomposed fragments as it separates from the third layer of the spore wall. The second layer is variable in appearance between various spores, but must be firmly attached to the laminae as it forms small pits and irregular shape which causes parts of the layer to break away when under pressure. The third layer is a pale yellow to yellow brown, laminate, and is 3.2–6.4 μm thick (mean of 4.7 μm).

=== Subtending hyphae ===
The Funneliformis mosseae species has a subtending hypha, a characteristic of AM fungi, which is the hyphae that the spores are produced from. The hyphae structure tends to be flask shaped and a yellow to yellow brown in color. In juvenile spores, the walls of the subtending hyphae are made up of three layers that are continuous with the layers of the spore walls. As the spores mature, oftentimes the hyphal wall will become one to two layers thick.

=== Germination ===
The germ tube in Funneliformis mosseae emerges from the spore wall and originates from the recurved septum. After the hypha emerges, extensive branching and growth of the germ tubes is able to occur.

== Distribution, habitat, season ==
Funneliformis mosseae is a hypogenous fungi, that is commonly found in loose aggregate soils. It has been found in a wide range of locations, and can be collected throughout the year, in all seasons. It is widespread in the Pacific Northwest, Midwest, Hawaii, England, Scotland, Germany, Australia, New Zealand and Pakistan. F. mosseae can withstand conditions ranging from coastal dune sands, mountain forests, and semi-arid zones; especially in alkaline flats, road banks, fields and forest clearings.

== Arbuscular mycorrhizal interactions ==
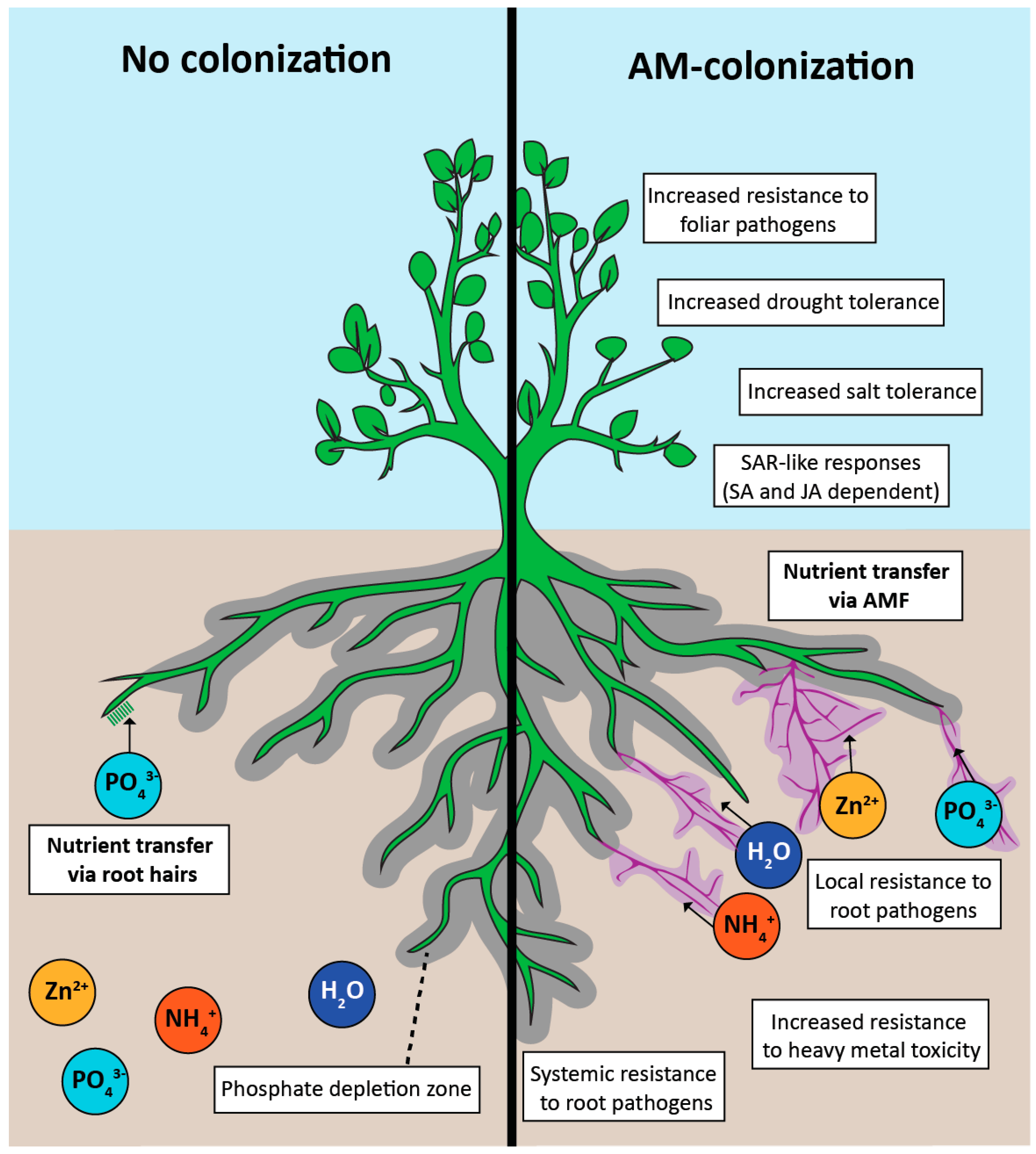

Funneliformis mosseae is a fungus that falls into the category of arbuscular mycorrhizal fungi (AMF), which are fungi that form symbiotic relationships with most terrestrial plants. The relationship is mutualistic, meaning that both the plant and fungi have benefits in forming these interactions with one another. Arbuscules are the site of entrance into the cells for the fungi, and a large hyphal network is formed, which allows for nutrient exchanges between the plant and fungi. Plants can often benefit greatly from these mutualistic interactions with certain fungi, such as increased nutrient absorption, resistance to varying environmental conditions, and resistance to some plant pathogens.

== Uses ==
One of the common uses of Funneliformis mosseae is in scientific research to study the ways in which AM fungi interact with their plant hosts. Many of these studies aim to determine the ways in which AM fungus relationships to plants can alter the conditions of the environment for growth. In previous studies using Funneliformis mosseae have shown to increase resistance to plant pathogens, increased resistance to heavy metal toxicity, increase resistance to drought and poor soil conditions, increased nutrient absorption, and has shown to increase root and shoot biomass in inoculated plants.
