= FAM204A =

Gene

Identifiers
- Aliases: FAM204A, C10orf84, bA319I23.1, family with sequence similarity 204 member A
- External IDs: MGI: 1289174; HomoloGene: 41463; GeneCards: FAM204A; OMA:FAM204A - orthologs

Gene location (Human)
Chr.	Chromosome 10 (human)
Band	10q26.11	Start	118,297,925 bp
Band	10q26.11	End	118,342,328 bp

Gene location (Mouse)
Chr.	Chromosome 19 (mouse)
Band	19 D3|19 56.52 cM	Start	60,187,018 bp
Band	19 D3|19 56.52 cM	End	60,215,133 bp
RNA expression pattern
Bgee	Human / Mouse (ortholog); Top expressed in: Achilles tendon; monocyte; left testis; right testis; ventricular zone; tibial arteries; gallbladder; rectum; ganglionic eminence; gastric mucosa / Top expressed in: zygote; hand; genital tubercle; ventricular zone; spermatocyte; tail of embryo; superior cervical ganglion; otolith organ; spermatid; utricle; More reference expression data
BioGPS	n/a
Orthologs
Species	Human	Mouse
Entrez	63877	76539
Ensembl	ENSG00000165669	ENSMUSG00000057858
UniProt	Q9H8W3	Q8C6C7
RefSeq (mRNA)	NM_001134672; NM_022063	NM_029648; NM_001358271; NM_001358272; NM_001358273
RefSeq (protein)	NP_001128144; NP_071346	NP_083924; NP_001345200; NP_001345201; NP_001345202
Location (UCSC)	Chr 10: 118.3 – 118.34 Mb	Chr 19: 60.19 – 60.22 Mb
PubMed search
- Wikidata
View/Edit Human	View/Edit Mouse

FAM204A (family with sequence similarity 204 member A) is a protein-coding gene that encodes the nuclear protein FAM204A in humans. The gene is located on chromosome 10 at position 10q26.11 and is ubiquitously expressed in human tissues.

== Gene ==
FAM204A spans approximately 44 kilobases (kb) at chromosomal position 118.30 to 118.34 megabases (Mb) on the GRCh38 assembly and is transcribed from the minus (complementary) DNA strand. It contains eight exons and produces two validated mRNA isoforms (NM_022063.3 and NM_001134672.2) that encode the same 233‑amino acid protein. Other identifiers include C10orf84 and bA319I23.1.

FAM204A's upstream neighbor is RAB11FIP2, which encodes a protein predicted to mediate protein kinase binding and dimerization and is expressed ubiquitously, with localization in the nucleoplasm and endosomal compartments. Its downstream neighbor is the long non‐coding RNA CASC2 (cancer susceptibility candidate 2), implicated as a tumor suppressor and consistently observed to be downregulated in multiple cancer types.

== Protein ==
The human FAM204A protein is 233 amino acids in length with a molecular weight of approximately 27 kilodaltons (kDa) and a predicted isoelectric point (pI) near 7.7.

FAM204A is lysine-rich and highly charged; nearly 40% of residues are basic or acidic. A lysine/arginine cluster between residues 95–114 resembles a nuclear localization signal (NLS) or nucleic acid-binding motif. No signal peptides or transmembrane regions are predicted, consistent with a soluble nuclear protein.

=== Subcellular localization ===
FAM204A is predicted to localize to the nucleus with high confidence by multiple computational tools. DeepLoc assigns a 0.90 probability for nuclear residency, while PSORT II identifies several monopartite and bipartite nuclear localization signals (e.g., KRRK at residue 100, bipartite motif KKHSEQKSTTSRFRGKR at residue 85). SAPS compositional analysis highlights a positively charged segment (residues 95–114) typical of nuclear localization or nucleic acid-binding motifs. Immunohistochemistry data show nuclear and nucleolar localization of FAM204A in human cells.

=== Post-translational modifications ===
Predicted post-translational modifications include multiple phosphorylation sites (serine 17, serine 40, serine 93–105) and tyrosine phosphorylation (tyrosine 65, tyrosine 232), as well as motifs for SUMOylation and acetylation. Experimental evidence supports phosphorylation at serine 152 (S152), ubiquitylation at lysine 128 (K128) and lysine 169 (K169), and acetylation at lysine 221 (K221) and lysine 222 (K222).

=== Structure ===
AlphaFold predicts a largely disordered protein with a single α‑helical domain spanning residues 126–211 (CATH fold 1.10.287) and high model confidence (pLDDT ≈94). This structured region may provide a stable core for interactions, while flanking regions remain intrinsically disordered.

== Conservation ==
FAM204A is broadly conserved across opisthokonts, with orthologous proteins identified in mammals, birds, reptiles, amphibians, fish, basal chordates (e.g., lancelets and tunicates), basal metazoans (e.g., sponges and cnidarians), and fungi.

Vertebrate orthologs share higher sequence identity (~35–~90%) with human FAM204A, while more distant orthologs retain a more conserved C‑terminal region despite overall lower identity (~21-30).

Common name	Scientific Name	Divergence (MYA)	Accession #	Seq Length (AA)	Seq ID %	Seq Sim %
Human	Homo sapiens	0	NP_001128144.1	233	100.0	100.0
Aye-aye	Daubentonia madagascariensis	74	KAL2769215.1	233	88.8	94.0
Mouse	Mus musculus	87	NP_001345202.1	236	78.8	88.6
Echidna	Tachyglossus aculeatus	180	XP_038614343.1	235	62.3	76.3
Rhea	Rhea pennata	319	XP_062436011.1	244	55.7	71.5
Chicken	Gallus gallus	319	XP_004942371.2	244	55.1	69.2
Zebrafish	Danio rerio	429	NP_001002536.1	256	44.2	61.7
Lamprey	Petromyzon marinus	563	XP_032817389.1	227	35.1	50.0
Lancelet	Branchiostoma floridae	581	XP_035676714.1	212	28.6	42.7
Sea squirt	Styela clava	596	XP_039271579.1	169	21.6	36.4
Trichoplax	Trichoplax sp. H2	661	RDD41954.1	227	21.7	40.4
Manila clam	Ruditapes philippinarum	686	XP_060572578.1	202	30.5	42.9
Deer tick	Ixodes scapularis	686	XP_002435965.3	220	27.1	45.0
Ribbon worm	Lineus longissimus	686	XP_064649596.1	210	26.5	46.6
Horseshoe crab	Limulus polyphemus	686	XP_013773511.1	288	26.3	42.8
Sea anemone	Nematostella vectensis	715	EDO37736.1	216	25.2	39.1
Sponge	Corticium candelabrum	758	XP_062502458.1	245	29.7	44.9
Fungus	Rhizophagus clarus	1275	GES81201.1	206	27.4	42.9
Anaerobic gut fungus	Anaeromyces robustus	1275	ORX87713.1	192	25.2	41.9

== Expression ==
RNA-seq and microarray studies indicate that FAM204A is ubiquitously but variably expressed at moderately high levels across human tissues, with higher transcript levels in cerebellum, kidney, prostate, thymus, thyroid, adipose tissue, and testis.

== Interactions ==
High-throughput affinity capture–mass spectrometry (BioPlex) and yeast two-hybrid screens identify nuclear and chromatin-associated interactors of FAM204A. Reported partners include nuclear transport receptors (KPNA2, KPNA3, KPNB1), histone modifiers (H2AFJ, HAT1, KDM1A, SMYD1), and chaperones (HSP90AB1, DNAJC8). These interactions suggest roles in nuclear import and chromatin regulation.

== Clinical significance ==
No Mendelian disorders are currently attributed to FAM204A. However, its locus on 10q26.11 has been implicated in complex traits. A genome‑wide linkage and association study identified this region as associated with late‑onset Alzheimer’s disease, although the signal may arise from FAM204A or neighboring genes within the locus.

FAM204A is included in a U.S. patent (US 20140315736A1) disclosing blood‑based biomarker panels scored for Alzheimer's disease diagnosis, among which C10orf84/FAM204A is listed. Variants in FAM204A also contribute to a polygenic "quit‑success" genotype score used to predict outcomes of smoking cessation therapy.

Mouse knockout studies demonstrate that deletion of the Fam204a ortholog in mice results in pre‑weaning lethality, indicating that the gene may be essential for viability in mammals.
