= Glomus macrocarpum =

Scientific classification
- Kingdom: Fungi
- Division: Glomeromycota
- Class: Glomeromycetes
- Order: Glomerales
- Family: Glomeraceae
- Genus: Glomus
- Species: G. macrocarpum

Binomial name
- Glomus macrocarpum Tul. & Tul. 1845

Species of fungus

Glomus macrocarpum is a vesicular-arbuscular endomycorrhizal plant pathogen in the Glomeraceae family of fungi. Also occasionally known as Endogone macrocarpa, G. macrocarpum is pathogenic to multiple plants, including tobacco and chili plants. G. macrocarpum was first discovered in the French woodlands by the Tulasne brothers in the early to mid 1800s. Their first known description of G. macrocarpum was published in the New Italian Botanical Journal in 1845. G. macrocarpum has since been documented in over 26 countries, including Australia, China, and Japan for example. G. macrocarpum is frequently found in grassy meadows, forests, greenhouses, and fruit orchards. It is known for its small, round-edged, and light brown to yellow-brown sporocarp. G. macrocarpum is sometimes known as the Glomerales truffle.

== Description ==
=== Morphology ===
The sporocarp of G. macrocarpum is small, usually measuring up to about 12 millimeters in diameter. The sporocarp shape ranges from globose, subglobose, elongate, to irregular. The sporocarp is also often observed to have soil (primary substrate) embedded in its surface. When the peridium is present, it appears white with a cottony texture. The sporocarp color ranges from yellow-brown to light brown.

Chlamydospores that act as resting spores or survival structures are present. These allow the fungus to remain dormant during inadequate germination conditions. Once appropriate germination conditions are reached, chlamydospores form germ tubes to germinate into hyphal structures that place pressure on plant surfaces in order to infiltrate various tissues and begin forming a mycorrhizal association. Chlamydospores are globose to ellipsoid, and aseptate. Spores range in size from about 100 to 350 μm in diameter. Spore walls are yellow to brown in color. Spores arise from subtending hyphae that range from 12 to 25 μm in width. Hyphae are also cylindrical and lacking in pigmentation. Both young and mature spores are often evident on the sporocarp surface. The sporocarp of G. macrocarpum is a relatively fragile structure with other environmental components, such as soil, sometimes embedded in its surface.

Ultrastructural studies indicate that two wall layers, containing fibrils, are present in spores. There is a slight separation zone present between the two wall layers. Spore contents are also indicated to be lipid globules from subtending hyphae as an energy source for the spores.

== Ecology ==
Glomus macrocarpum is a vesicular arbuscular mycorrhizal fungus that forms associations with many different plant types. The fungus grows in a hypogeous manner, just underneath the topsoil in various geographical locations and environments. The fruiting season of G. macrocarpum occurs during the summer and fall months. Until relatively recently, Glomus species were thought to be exclusively asexual organisms. However, studies have been conducted to analyze the presence of sex pheromone sensing proteins in some Glomus species. The presence of these sensing proteins is indicative that species in this genus may not be entirely asexual. However, the validity of a sexual process in Glomus species has not been confirmed.

== Importance ==
Laboratory studies of G. macrocarpum indicate that the species has both positive and negative effects on a variety of plant species, many of which are of economic importance worldwide.

=== Spore survival ===
Glomus macrocarpum spores have been studied and subjected to autoclaving or ethanol treatment in order to measure the ability of spores to survive under these conditions. Spores that were treated were sourced either from fresh pot cultures or from cultures stored for five years. Spores were treated with MTT stain, which causes living spores to appear red and non-living spores to appear black or dark blue. After treatment, the percentage of living spores was measured at 10, 20, 30, 40, and 72 hours. Results indicated that spores sourced from fresh pot cultures had a higher survival rate after treatment than those sourced from five year old cultures. Results also indicated that after 72 hours most spores that were stained red (living) from 40 to 72 hours had turned black or dark blue and were no longer viable. Since G. macrocarpum can be pathogenic and often remains in areas for a long period of time after sporocarp removal, researchers are attempting to understand the effect that time, combined with other treatments, has on spore viability.

=== Biological impact ===
Glomus macrocarpum was discovered to be a strong factor in improving essential oil quality and concentration in dill and carum plants. Both of these plants are used commonly as spices, and essential oil quality and concentration is an important part of what allows plants to be used as spices. Glomus macrocarpum was found to be more effective than other Glomus species at enhancing essential oil concentrations. Analyzed plants were inoculated with G. macrocarpum inoculated soil and the essential oils in the plants were analyzed after 15 weeks, allowing for the Glomus species to form mycorrhizal associations effectively. Studies found that there was a significant increase in biomass due to the mycorrhizal association with G. macrocarpum. Host plants inoculated with G. macrocarpum were observed to have higher shoot growth than that of the control group after 15 weeks.

Glomus macrocarpum is one fungal species among many whose ability to enhance plant uptake of nutrients is being studied. Worldwide, crops are grown using chemical fertilizers enriched with the required nutrients for plant growth. However, this practice has proven to be unsustainable due to worsening water quality in places where these chemical fertilizers are heavily relied on. G. macrocarpum and others are being considered as a way to lessen the amount of chemical fertilizers necessary for producing crops of economic importance.

=== Plant host impact ===
Spore production of G. macrocarpum is influenced by a variety of host plants. Studies have shown that G. macrocarpum spore production significantly increases with bahiagrass as a plant host when compared to corn or sudangrass as plant hosts. Studies indicate that G. macrocarpum spore production will change significantly after at least 14 weeks after planting inoculated host plants.

== Habitat and geographical distribution ==
Glomus species are found in nearly all terrestrial habitats including arable land, deserts, grasslands, tropical forests, mesic forests, and deciduous forests. G. macrocarpum has been identified in over 26 countries in different climates throughout the world, including: Australia, Austria, Belgium, Brazil, Canada, China, Denmark, France, Germany, Hungary, Ireland, Italy, Romania, Sweden, and the United States of America.
