= Neocallimastix patriciarum =

Scientific classification
- Kingdom: Fungi
- Division: Neocallimastigomycota
- Class: Neocallimastigomycetes
- Order: Neocallimastigales
- Family: Neocallimastigaceae
- Genus: Neocallimastix
- Species: N. patriciarum

Binomial name
- Neocallimastix patriciarum Orpin & Munn 1986

Species of fungus

Neocallimastix patriciarum is a species of fungus that lives in the rumen of sheep and other ruminant species. N. patriciarum is an obligate anaerobe and is an important component of the microbial population within the rumen. Only one of a few rumen fungi, this species is interesting and unique within the fungal world. Originally thought to be a flagellate protists, species within the phylum Neocallimastigomycota were first recognized as a fungus by Colin Orpin in 1975 when he demonstrated that they had cell walls of chitin

== Taxonomic classification ==
N. patriciarum, along with other species in Neocallimastix, were originally considered part of Chytridiomycota. They have since been more accurately classified into the newly named phylum Neocallimystigomycota which encompasses only one family: Neocallimastigaceae. The classification of N. patriciarum in Chytridiomycota was primarily due to the presence of flagellated zoospores, a defining characteristic of the Chytridiomycota phylum. Neocallimystigomycota has been elevated to phylum level based on significant differences in morphological traits and molecular phylogenetics.

== Morphology ==
=== Thallus ===
N. patriciarum have monocentric thalli. The young thallus is made up of incipient zoosporangium and rhizoids, as is typical of monocentric thalli. The rhizoids are coiled and a septum delineating the zoosporangium is present in the mature thallus. An apophysis can be observed between the main rhizoid and the zoosporangium. Zoospores are released through a single apical pore present on the mature thallus.

=== Zoospore ===
N. patriciarum have multi-flagellated zoospores that range from spherical to equatorially constricted. The ultrastructure of zoospores has been used to distinguish between N. patriciarum and N. frontalis, although some researchers suggest that this is method of distinction is unsound due to insufficient samples. Zoospore composition in N. patriciarum is also unique in that it lacks mitochondria, golgi bodies, liquid droplets, or gamma particles, all of which are present in aerobic fungi. The presence of a hydrogenosome is thought to replace the mitochondrion, and is described as an organelle that is capable of anaerobic metabolism of hexoses to acetic and formic acids and likely derived from mitochondria

== Life cycle ==
The multi-flagellate zoospores encyst and germinate to form young thalli. The lifecycle is simple in that it alternates between the motile zoospore and a vegetative stage. The vegetative stage is typically associated with plant material in the digestive tract of host animal.

N. patriciarum can exist outside of the internal protected habitat of the rumen as cysts or melanized thalli in dried feces. Transmission into a new host can occur through licking or grooming leading to ingestion and continuation of the lifecycle starting with germination of the cyst.

== Habitat, ecology, and lifestyle ==
As an anaerobic fungi, N. patriciarum relies on the ability of hydrogenosomes to metabolize hexoses in the anaerobic environment of the rumen. This allows the fungi to act in symbiosis with methanogenic rumen bacteria which create a pathway for the hydrogen byproduct to be converted to methane and emitted from the ruminant digestive tracts. Essentially, N. patriciarum works with rumen bacteria and protozoa (those that make up the microbial population) to degrade ingested plant biomass. Since N. patriciarum colonizes and degrades plant material within the rumen ecosystem, it is considered saprophytic. It has various enzymes that allow it to break down xylan, cellulose, starch, and glycogen. This efficient and specific enzymatic action opens up N. patriciarum to extensive research in biofuels production.
