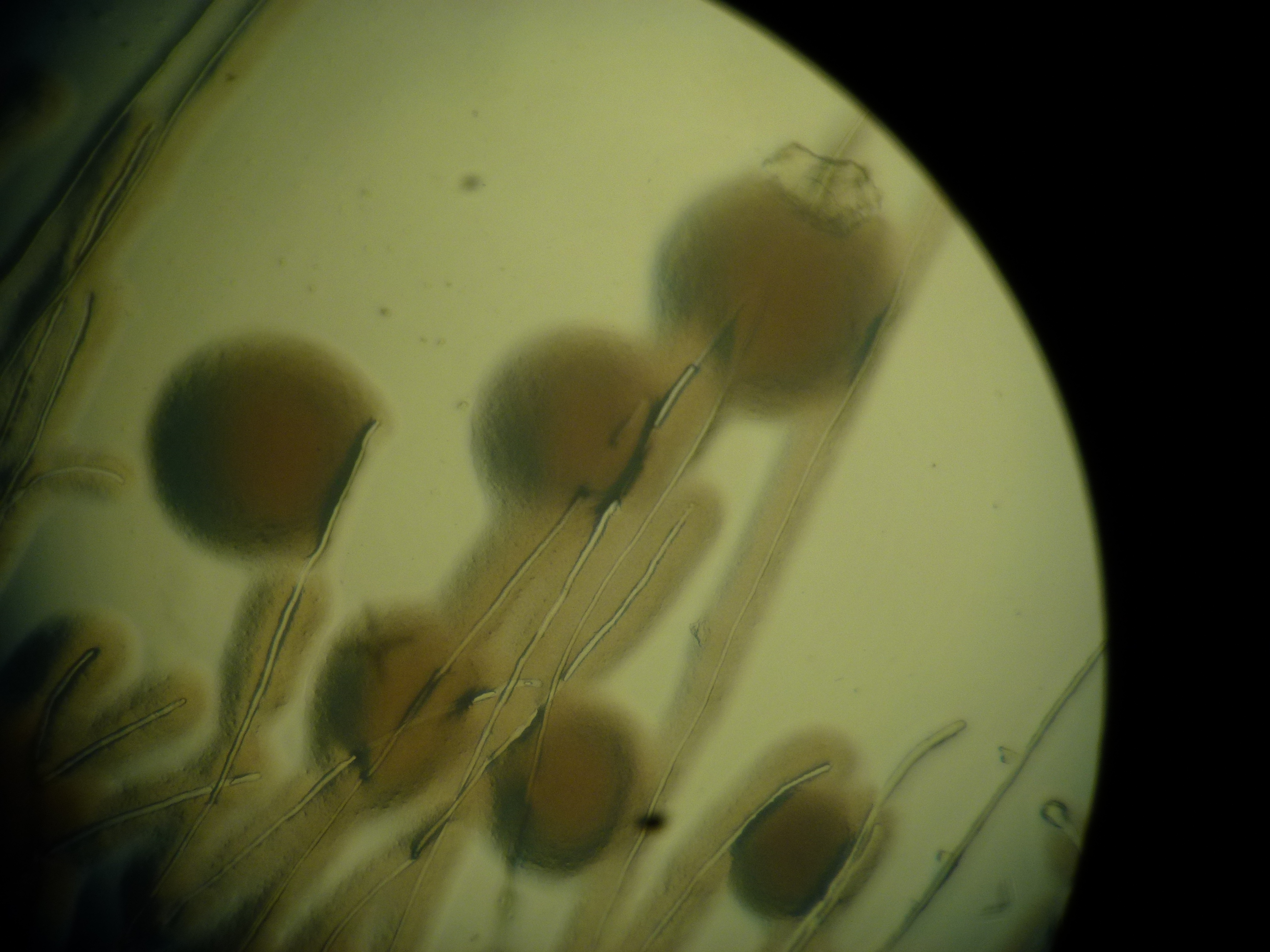
- Spores of Funneliformis mosseae

Scientific classification
- Domain: Eukaryota
- Kingdom: Fungi
- Division: Glomeromycota
- Class: Glomeromycetes
- Order: Glomerales
- Family: Glomeraceae
- Genus: Funneliformis; C.Walker & A.Schüßler (2010)

Type species
- Funneliformis mosseae (T.H.Nicolson & Gerd.) C.Walker & A.Schüßler (2010)

= Funneliformis =

Genus of fungi

Funneliformis is a genus of fungi in the family Glomeraceae. All species are arbuscular mycorrhizal (AM) fungi that form symbiotic relationships (mycorrhizaa) with plant roots. The genus was circumscribed in 2010 by Arthur Schüßler and Christopher Walker, with Funneliformis mosseae (named after the biologist Barbara Mosse and originally described in 1968 as a species of Endogone) as the type species. The generic name refers to the funnel-shaped spore base present in several species.

== Species ==
- Funneliformis africanum (Błaszk. & Kovács) C.Walker & A.Schüßler 2010
- Funneliformis badium (Oehl, D.Redecker & Sieverd.) C.Walker & A.Schüßler 2010
- Funneliformis caledonium (T.H.Nicolson & Gerd.) C.Walker & A.Schüßler 2010
- Funneliformis constrictum (Trappe) C.Walker & A.Schüßler 2010
- Funneliformis coronatum (Giovann.) C.Walker & A.Schüßler 2010
- Funneliformis fragilistratum (Skou & I. Jakobsen) C.Walker & A.Schüßler 2010
- Funneliformis geosporum (T.H.Nicolson & Gerd.) C.Walker & A.Schüßler 2010
- Funneliformis mosseae (T.H.Nicolson & Gerd.) C.Walker & A.Schüßler 2010
- Funneliformis verruculosum (Błaszk.) C.Walker & A. Schüßler 2010
- Funneliformis xanthium (Błaszk., Blanke, Renker & Buscot) C.Walker & A.Schüßler 2010
