= Rhizophagus =

Rhizophagus may refer to:

- Rhizophagus (fungus), a genus in the family Glomeraceae
- Rhizophagus (beetle), a genus in the family Monotomidae
