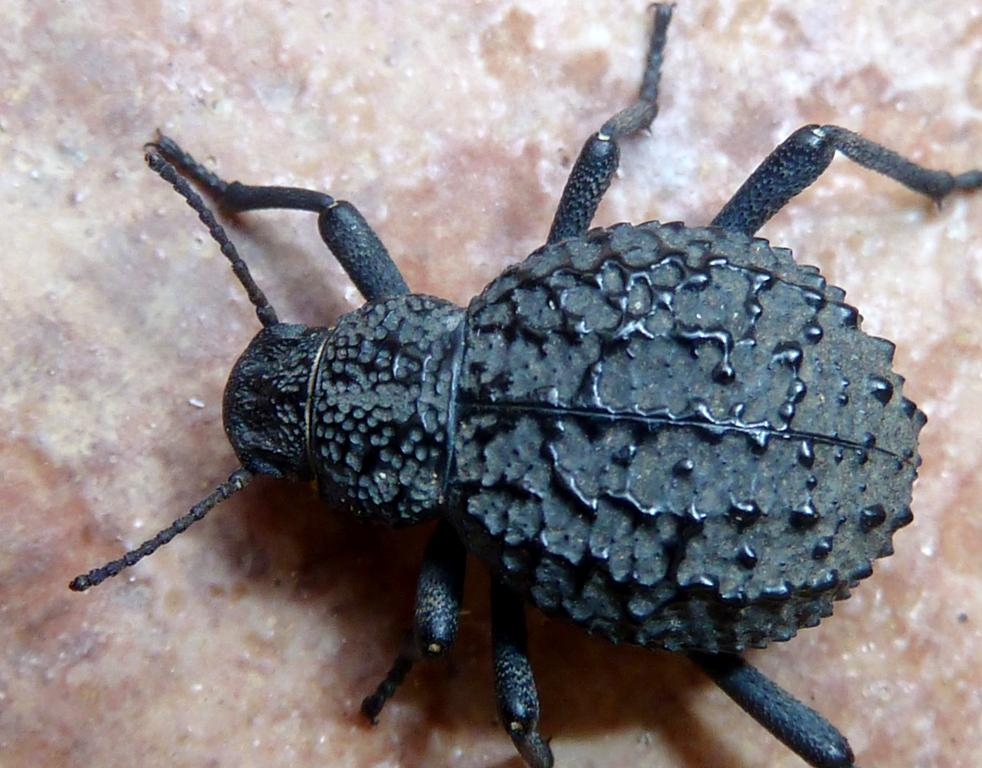
- Renatiella reticulata in Limpopo

Scientific classification
- Kingdom: Animalia
- Phylum: Arthropoda
- Class: Insecta
- Order: Coleoptera
- Suborder: Polyphaga
- Infraorder: Cucujiformia
- Family: Tenebrionidae
- Genus: Renatiella
- Species: R. reticulata

Binomial name
- Renatiella reticulata (Gerstäcker, 1854)

= Renatiella reticulata =

Species of beetle

Renatiella reticulata is a species of diurnal, herbivorous beetle that is native to East and southern Africa. It has rather long legs, and is the most widespread, apomorphic and polytypic species of its genus.

== Range ==
It has been recorded in Tanzania, Zambia, Botswana, Zimbabwe and South Africa.

== Biology ==
The widespread species occurs on various sandy substrates, and adults are encountered at any time of the year. Larvae and adults feed on dead or decaying plant material, while under or on the soil surface. Though not arboreal, they may climb up to one foot above ground along stumps or shrub stems to escape immersion, a habit not found in related beetles. They have been recorded on field-stooped maize, ploughed in grass sods, sunn hemp and tobacco stalks. On occasion they may attack sown maize or young tobacco crops.
