= Oontomyces =

Scientific classification
- Domain: Eukaryota
- Kingdom: Fungi
- Division: Neocallimastigomycota
- Class: Neocallimastigomycetes
- Order: Neocallimastigales
- Family: Neocallimastigaceae
- Genus: Oontomyces; Dagar, Puniya & Griffith 2015

Type species
- Oontomyces anksri Dagar, Puniya & Griffith 2015

Species
- O. anksri Dagar, Puniya & Griffith 2015

Genus of fungi

Oontomyces is a genus of anaerobic fungi isolated from the digestive tract of Indian camel.
