= Orpinomyces =

Scientific classification
- Domain: Eukaryota
- Kingdom: Fungi
- Division: Neocallimastigomycota
- Class: Neocallimastigomycetes
- Order: Neocallimastigales
- Family: Neocallimastigaceae
- Genus: Orpinomyces; D.J.S. Barr, H. Kudo, Jakober & K.J. Cheng 1989

Species
- O. bovis Barr et al. 1989; O. intercalaris Ho 1994

Genus of fungi

Orpinomyces is a genus of fungi in the family Neocallimastigaceae.
