= Cyllamyces =

Scientific classification
- Domain: Eukaryota
- Kingdom: Fungi
- Division: Neocallimastigomycota
- Class: Neocallimastigomycetes
- Order: Neocallimastigales
- Family: Neocallimastigaceae
- Genus: Cyllamyces; Ozkose, B.J. Thomas, D.R. Davies, G.W. Griff. & Theodorou 2001

Type species
- Cyllamyces aberensis Ozkose, B.J. Thomas, D.R. Davies, G.W. Griff. & Theodorou 2001

Species
- C. aberensis Dagar, Puniya & Griffith 2015; C. icaris Sridhar, Deep. Kumar & Anandan 2014

Single-species genus of fungi

Cyllamyces is a fungal genus in the family Neocallimastigaceae. This is a monotypic genus, containing the single species Cyllamyces aberensis.
