= Buwchfawromyces =

Scientific classification
- Kingdom: Fungi
- Division: Neocallimastigomycota
- Class: Neocallimastigomycetes
- Order: Neocallimastigales
- Family: Neocallimastigaceae
- Genus: Buwchfawromyces; Callaghan & Griffith 2015

Type species
- Buwchfawromyces eastonii Callaghan & Griffith 2015

Species
- Buwchfawromyces eastonii Callaghan & Griffith 2015

Genus of fungi

Buwchfawromyces is a genus of anaerobic fungi isolated from buffalo faeces
