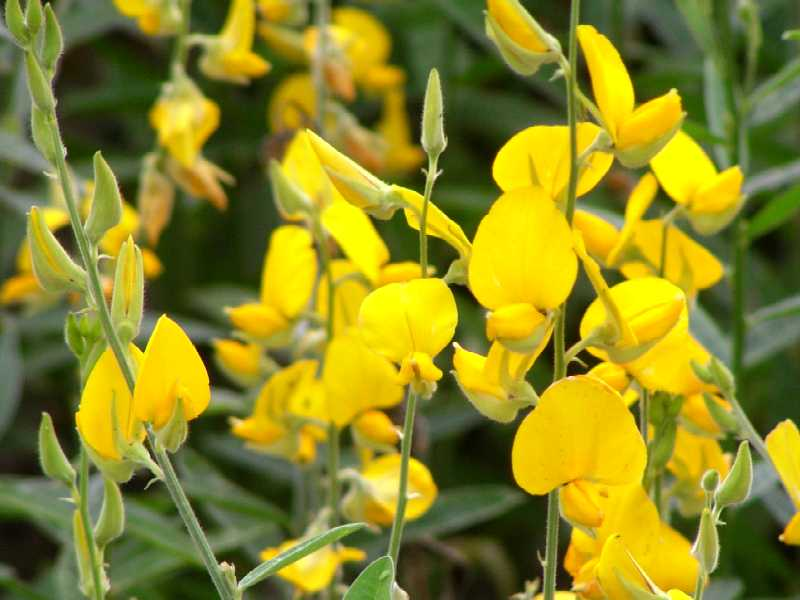

Scientific classification
- Kingdom: Plantae
- Clade: Tracheophytes
- Clade: Angiosperms
- Clade: Eudicots
- Clade: Rosids
- Order: Fabales
- Family: Fabaceae
- Subfamily: Faboideae
- Genus: Crotalaria
- Species: C. juncea

Binomial name
- Crotalaria juncea L.

Synonyms
- Crotalaria benghalensis Lam. (1786); Crotalaria cannabinua Royle (1834); Crotalaria fenestrata Sims (1817); Crotalaria juncea var. bengalensis (Lam.) Kuntze (1891); Crotalaria juncea var. puncticulata DC. (1825); Crotalaria kanchiana Gholave, Mane, Gore, Kambale & S.P.Gaikwad (2019); Crotalaria porrecta Wall. (1831), nom. nud.; Crotalaria sericea Willd. (1800), nom. illeg.; Crotalaria tenuifolia Roxb. (1819); Isotropis argentea Ewart & Morrison (1913)

= Crotalaria juncea =

Species of legume

Crotalaria juncea, known as brown hemp, Indian hemp, Madras hemp, or Sunn hemp, is a tropical Asian plant of the legume family (Fabaceae). It is generally considered to have originated in India.

It is now widely grown in the Indian subcontinent and Brazil for its fiber, which makes it especially useful in the manufacturing of twine, rug yarn and fish nets. This plant is also used as forage for cattle and goats as they have a significant percentage of protein (34.6%). Additionally, according to new research from the Agricultural Research Service (ARS), Sunn hemp is being looked at as a possible bio-fuel. After being put under experimental research the Sunn hemp was found to have produced 82.4 gigajoules of energy per acre, equivalent to 620 gallons of gas. Although it is a useful plant it can be an invasive weed and has been listed as a noxious weed in some jurisdictions.

== Description ==
This plant is shrubby, with yellow flowers, short soft hairs covering the stems, and can grow up to 9 feet tall. It has elongated alternate leaves, meaning the leaf pattern on the stem is a spiral.

Part	Appearance	Length	Width	Arrangement	Notes
Whole Plant	Herbaceous Shrubby	Up to 3–9 ft.	N/A	N/A	Subtropical Vegetative growth occurs during the longer summer days.
Stem	Thick Pubescent (covered in short, small hairs)	N/A	1/2 - 2 In. Diameter	N/A	N/A
Leaves	Bright Green Trifoliate Leaves Simple and Elliptical Leaves	1.5 - 5 in.	.25 - 1 in.	Spiraled around the stem	N/A
Roots	Long tap root Lateral roots	N/A	N/A	N/A	N/A
Flowers	Yellow Flowers Elongated Inflorescences Butterfly-shaped	10 in.	N/A	N/A	The upper petal may have a purple streak.
Seed Pod	Dry, loose seeds Rattle Heart Shaped Dark Gray to Black	1 in.	1/2 in.	N/A	N/A

== Modern applications ==
Crotalaria juncea has many practical applications in the modern world. First, it is a source of natural fiber. It is used for cordage, fishing nets, ropes, and more. It is particularly beneficial because of its resistance to root-knot nematodes and is also a soil improving crop via nitrogen fixation. The Sunn Hemp Research Station of Uttar Pradesh further researched Crotalaria juncea's genotypic impact on fiber yield. Four different genotypes of Crotalaria juncea were observed for three years to determine which genotype would yield in a high fiber yield. Important data that was collected across the plant genotypes include height (cm), basal diameter (mm), green biomass weight (q/ha), fiber weight (q/ha), and stick weight (q/ha). Out of the four genotypes, SUIN-029 was superior in resulting in a high fiber yield. This genotype can even be used as a template for future breeding.

Another practical application of Crotalaria juncea includes fuel. Crotalaria juncea holds a relatively high fuel value. In fact, a process optimization method for the extraction of oil from Crotalaria juncea is being researched to utilize the fuel value in Crotalaria juncea. The current method of oil extraction is known as the Soxhlet based extraction which has an oil yield of 13% in four hours at 37 degrees Celsius. However, a novel three-phase partitioning based extraction shows an oil yield of 37% in two hours at 37 degrees Celsius. Furthermore, the optimization factors that were identified include ammonium sulphate and butanol, pH, and temperature, and these factors impact the oil yield.

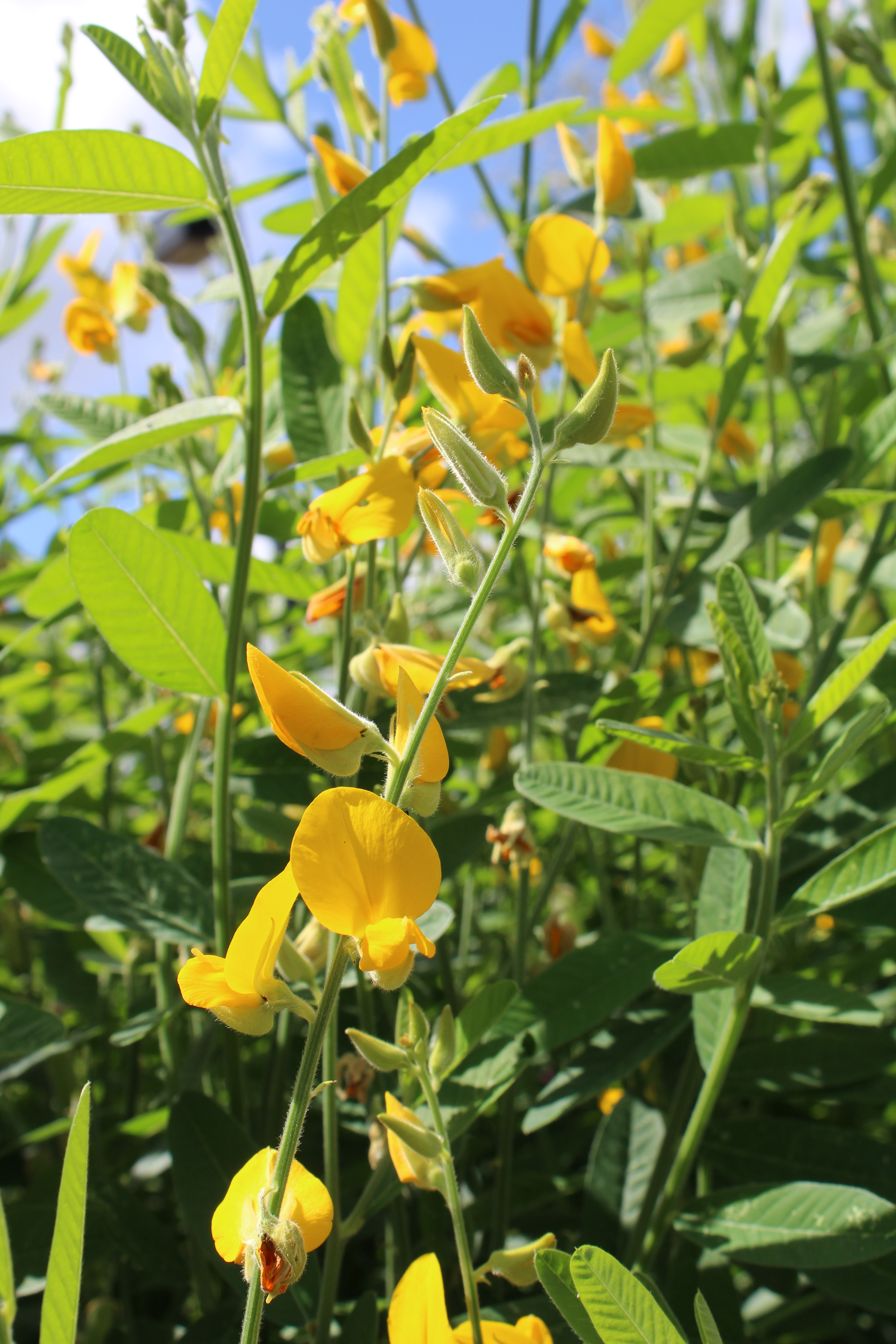
A closer look at the Sunn Hemp plant.

Furthermore, Crotalaria juncea has applications in the agricultural field since it impacts common food production. Crotalaria juncea is identified as a plant that is an important summer cover crop in southeastern United States. The allelopathic effects of Crotalaria juncea on weeds, vegetable crops, and cover crops were observed via greenhouse and growth chamber experiments. Crotalaria juncea, reduced both the germination and seedlings of various crop species (bell pepper, tomato, onion, and others). The allelochemical activity in Crotalaria juncea was in the leaves and remained active for 16 days after harvest. Furthermore, Crotalaria juncea's allelochemical effect may have practical applications for weed management.

Similarly, Crotalaria juncea can be used to improve nutrient patterns in agricultural plants. For instance, soil fertility in Paraiba, Brazil is generally low. To rectify this, animal manure is often used to supply agricultural crops with nutrients. However, researchers in Brazil hypothesized that planting and incorporating Crotalaria juncea with animal manure could enhance the nutrient mineralization pattern for agricultural crops. Field and greenhouse experiments were used to test this hypothesis. After measuring the amounts of Nitrogen, Phosphorus, and Potassium in the soils, it was discovered that Crotalaria juncea along with only half the usual dose of goat manure produced the best results. This is because soils that consisted of this composition avoided immobilization of nitrogen while increasing the levels of phosphorus and potassium within the soil. In other words, Crotalaria juncea was able to improve the overall nutrient mineralization pattern for agricultural crops.

Additionally, other research also observed Crotalaria juncea's potential in being used as an organic compost. Researchers in Brazil looked into the best composition of organic compost using various combinations of Crotalaria juncea and Napier grass. The objective was to find the mixture between Crotalaria juncea and Napier grass that would yield the highest vegetable seedling production. More specifically, the vegetable seedling production of lettuce, beetroot, and tomatoes was measured by observing the shoot height, fresh mass production in shoots and dry matter, and leaf number. The compost with 66% Crotalaria juncea and 33% Napier grass was superior to other combinations since this particular combination yielded the greatest production of lettuce, beet, and tomato seedlings.

Finally, another important usage of Crotalaria Juncea is as forage. It is primarily used as forage for goats and cattle, but of the genotypic variations only one contains non-toxic seeds and pods. This variation 'Tropic Sun' contains 34.6% crude protein and should be consumed by goats 45 days after planting. This allows for the plant to mature enough before growing out of the goat's reach. Additionally, the crop can be used for cattle, but due to its high fiber content, it is not suitable after maturity of 6 weeks or more.

=== Biofuel ===
Crotalaria juncea has been researched by multiple scientific experts on its ability to be used as a Bio-fuel source. Specifically, the Agricultural Research Service has found that farmers can utilize the crop by harvesting it for biofuel. Under certain conditions, like increased rainfall, the biomass of the crop totaled 4.5 tons per acre. This is essentially the equivalent of 620 gallons of gasoline and totals 82.4 gigajoules per acre. Additionally, the higher heating value (HHV) for Crotalaria juncea exceeded that of switchgrass, bermudagrass, reed canarygrass, and alfalfa. On the other hand, under conditions like reduced rainfall, the biomass of the Sunn Hemp crop decreases significantly. Another study asserted these claims by studying the effects of Sunn hemp in temperate climates. They found after full flowering in a temperate climate the crop was able to yield significantly more biomass energy.

== Phytoremediation ==
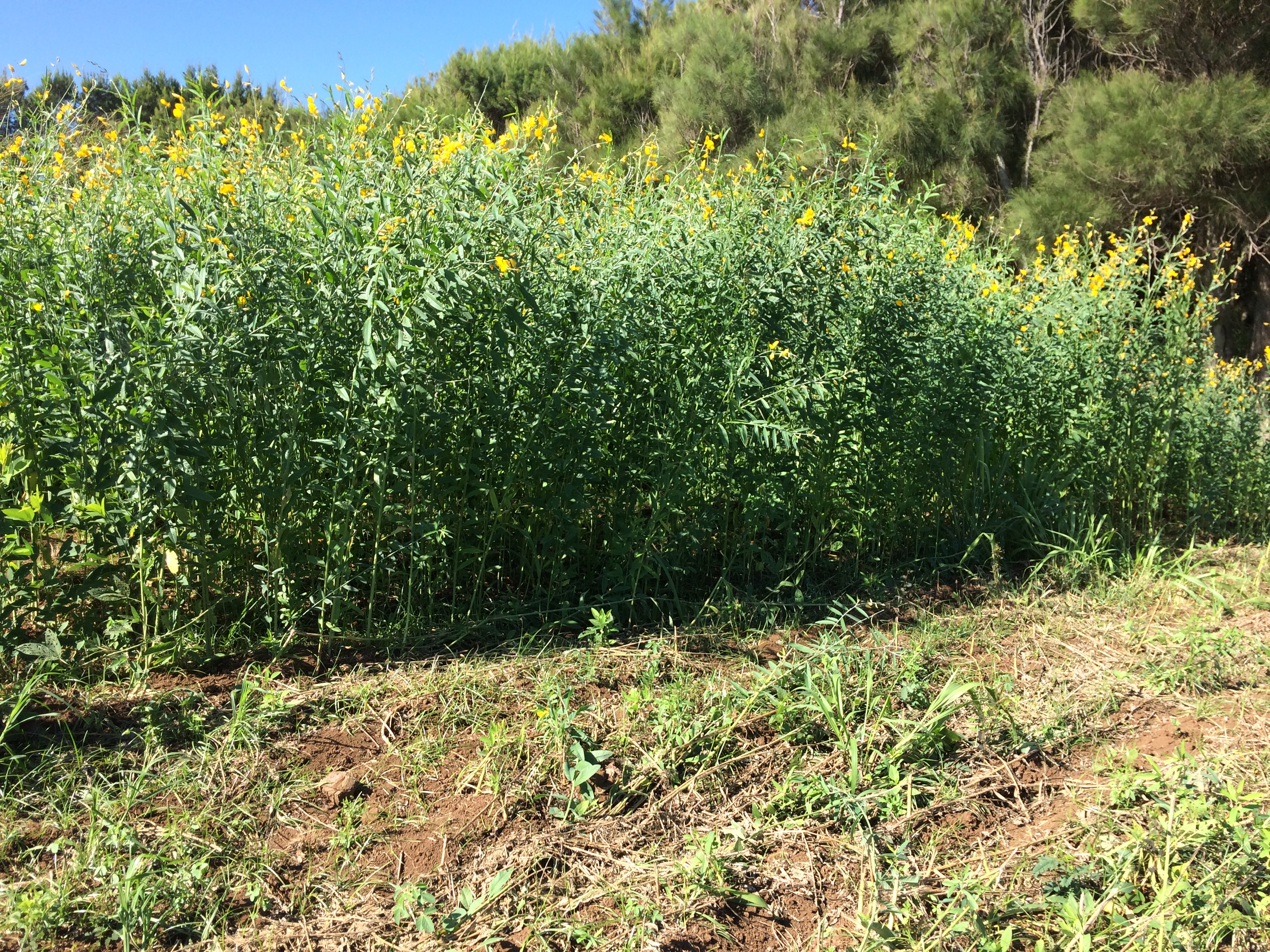
Sunn Hemp being used as a cover crop

There are several methods that have been shown to be effective as in decontamination and remediation of contaminated soils. A highly applicable method of soil remediation known as phytoremediation has shows to be effective in soils contaminated by heavy metals. Such heavy metals include copper, which have a unique effect on the Sunn hemp crop. The method of phytoremediation functions effectively in decontamination and remediation

By using microorganisms and plants to remove, transfer, stabilize, or destroy harmful elements. Crotalaria juncea found in soils contaminated with herbicides revealed high phytoremediation capacity. In addition, phytoremediation is effective in removal of copper, which has been identified as a metal strongly present in the soil of Crotalaria juncea.

Cultivated soil high in copper levels has proven to be effective in increasing the growth of Crotalaria juncea. However, an excess of copper in plant tissues has demonstrated the potential of affecting both physiological and biochemical processes including photosynthesis. Toxicity resulting from excessive copper has also resulted in altered effects that have been found to affect the cellular and molecular levels of the plant. Excessive copper levels can ultimately result in depletion of necessary nutrients. This nutrient deficiency occurs when the interactions of copper with sulfhydryl groups of enzymes and proteins inhibit enzyme activity or result in changes in the structure or replacement of key elements. The structures of chloroplasts have been affected by the excess of copper, which ultimately resulted in decreased pigmentation levels of Crotalaria juncea. There are, however, studies that have indicated that Crotalaria juncea has a high tolerance to copper concentrations in the soil and root systems which are beneficial traits for phytostabilization programs.

== Phosphate and Rhizophagus clarus ==
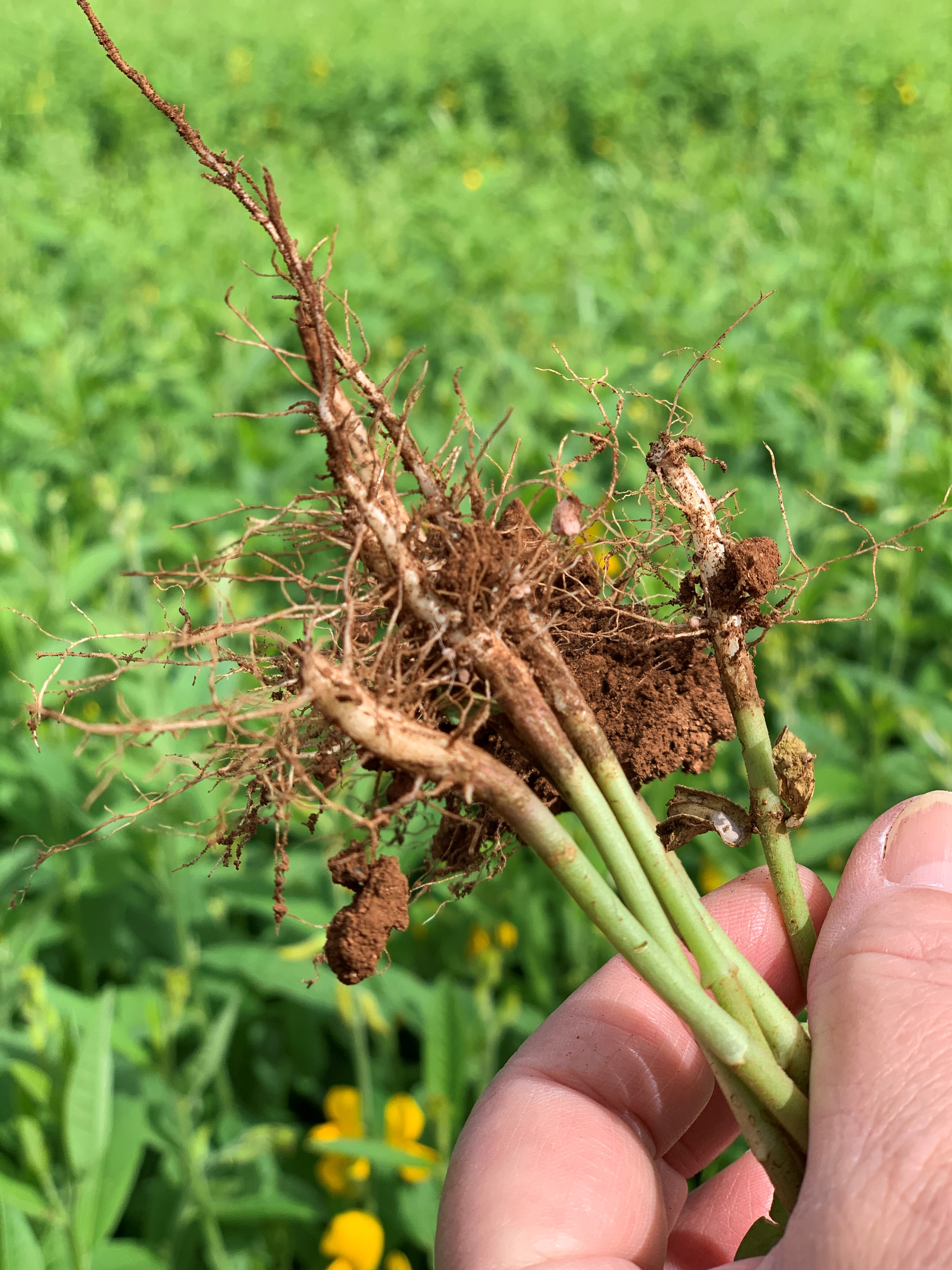
A close up of the root system of a Crotalaria juncea Plant

Studies have also shown that phosphate and Rhizophagus clarus (an arbuscular mycorrhizal fungus) are capable in altering the physiological responses of Crotalaria juncea that is found in soil high in copper levels. Phosphate has been demonstrated to be effective in reducing the level of toxicity in Crotalaria juncea, resulting in promotion of plant growth. When the application of phosphate is coupled with the inoculation of Rhizophagus clarus, the result is a synergistic effect that allows copper toxicity levels to be reduced through various mechanisms. This ultimately allows for the increased growth of Crotalaria juncea in spite of having been cultivated in high levels of copper.

There have been other effective approaches in decreasing the levels of copper in Crotalaria juncea with the use of arbuscular mycorrhizal fungi (AMF). Phosphate uptake is significantly improved in the presence of AMF, which functions to effectively reduce the amount of available heavy metals. The symbioses with AMF and soil supplementation of phosphate allows for the promotion growth of Crotalaria juncea. Despite the high levels of copper in the soil of Crotalaria juncea, mechanisms have been determined which can reverse the toxic effects of copper and allow for growth of the plant.
