= Pecoramyces =

Scientific classification
- Domain: Eukaryota
- Kingdom: Fungi
- Division: Neocallimastigomycota
- Class: Neocallimastigomycetes
- Order: Neocallimastigales
- Family: Neocallimastigaceae
- Genus: Pecoramyces; Hanafy, N.H. Youssef, G.W. Griff. & Elshahed
- Species: P. ruminantium

Binomial name
- Pecoramyces ruminantium Hanafy, N.H. Youssef, G.W. Griff. & Elshahed

Genus of fungi

Pecoramyces is a genus of anaerobic fungus within phylum Neocallimastigomycota. The genus contains a single species Pecoramyces ruminantium.
