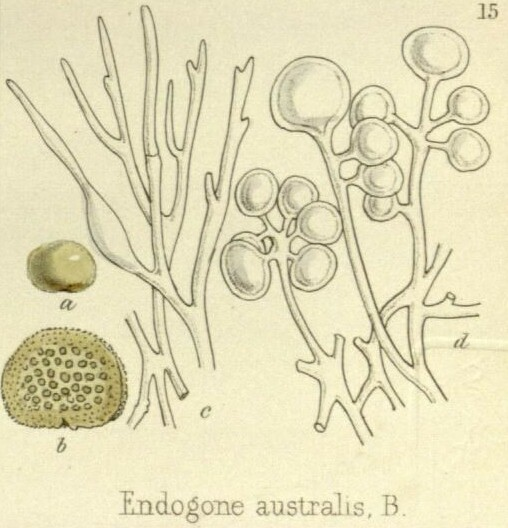
- Glomus australe formerly Endogone australis

Scientific classification
- Kingdom: Fungi
- Division: Glomeromycota
- Class: Glomeromycetes
- Order: Glomerales
- Family: Glomeraceae
- Genus: Glomus; Tul. & C.Tul. (1845)

Type species
- Glomus macrocarpum Tul. & C.Tul. (1845)

Species
- ca. 85 species described

Synonyms
- Rhizophagus P.A.Dang. (1896); Sphaerocreas Sacc. & Ellis (1882); Stigeosporium C.West (1916)

= Glomus (fungus) =

Genus of arbuscular mycorrhizal fungi

Glomus is a genus of arbuscular mycorrhizal fungi, all of its species forming symbiotic relationships (mycorrhizae) with plant roots.

== Taxonomy ==
Glomus is one of the genera in the family Glomeraceae,

Glomus is the largest genus of AM fungi, with about 85 species described, but is currently defined as non-monophyletic. It is likely related to the fossil fungus Glomites, discovered in the Rhynie chert deposits from the Early Devonian (400 million years ago).

=== Species ===
- Glomus aggregatum
- Glomus albidum
- Glomus ambisporum
- Glomus brazillanum
- Glomus caledonium
- Glomus coremioides
- Glomus claroideum
- Glomus clarum
- Glomus clavisporum
- Glomus constrictum
- Glomus coronatum
- Glomus deserticola
- Glomus diaphanum
- Glomus eburneum
- Glomus etunicatum
- Glomus fasciculatum
- Glomus fistulosum
- Glomus fragilistratum
- Glomus geosporum
- Glomus globiferum
- Glomus heterosporum
- Glomus hoi
- Glomus intraradices
- Glomus lacteum
- Glomus lamellosum
- Glomus luteum
- Glomus manihotis
- Glomus microaggregatum
- Glomus monosporum
- Glomus mosseae
- Glomus multicaule
- Glomus pansihalos
- Glomus pustulatum
- Glomus sinuosum
- Glomus spurcum
- Glomus tortuosum
- Glomus trimurales
- Glomus verruculosum
- Glomus versiforme
- Glomus viscosum

== Life cycle ==
Glomus species were considered to be entirely asexual until recently. Spores are produced at the tips of hyphae either within the host root or outside the root in the soil. Thought to be chlamydospores, these spores germinate and the germination tube that is produced grows through the soil until it comes into contact with roots. The fungus then penetrates the root and grows between root cells, or it may penetrate the cell wall and grow within root cells. Inside the root, the fungus forms arbuscules, which are highly branched hyphal structures that serve as sites of nutrient exchange with the plant. Arbuscules are formed within plant cell walls but are surrounded by an invaginated cell membrane, so remain within the apoplast. The fungus may also form vesicles, swollen structures which are thought to function as food storage organs.

=== Meiosis ===
Halary et al. searched the genomes of four Glomus species for the presence of genes that encode proteins essential for meiosis. These proteins make up the conserved meiotic recombination machinery of eukaryotic cells. The study indicated that the Glomus species contain 51 genes encoding all the tools necessary for meiotic recombination and associated DNA repair processes. In particular, these species have seven genes that encode proteins whose only known function is in meiosis, including Dmc1 that is a meiosis-specific recombinase. Since meiosis is considered to be a hallmark of sexual reproduction, it might be expected that a sexual stage or a sexual apparatus should be present, but none has yet been identified. In addition, mating type gene homologues and a putative sex hormone-sensing pathway were detected in these fungi. Based on these findings it was suggested that Glomus species may be able to undergo a cryptic sexual cycle.

The population structure of G. etunicatum suggests that clonal expansion plays an important role in the ecological success of Glomus species, and that gene exchanges are not completely absent, although likely very rare.

== Ecology ==
As with other AM fungi, all Glomus species are thought to be obligate symbionts, dependent on their mycorrhizal association with plant roots to complete their life cycle. They cannot be cultured in the laboratory in the absence of a plant host. Glomus species are found in nearly all terrestrial habitats, including arable land, deserts, grasslands, tropical forests, and tundras.

Arbuscular mycorrhizal fungi can provide numerous benefits to their plant hosts, including improved nutrient uptake, drought resistance, and disease resistance. However, the symbiosis is not mutualistic in all circumstances and may often be parasitic, with a detrimental effect on plant growth. Rarely, some plant species can parasitise the fungi. Prior to germinating, Glomus spores produce an electric current.

== Agricultural significance ==
Several species of Glomus, including G. aggregatum, are cultured and sold as mycorrhizal inoculant for agricultural soils. One species, G. macrocarpum (and possibly also G. microcarpum), causes tobacco stunt disease.

== See also ==
- Glomalin
