= Piromyces =

Scientific classification
- Kingdom: Fungi
- Division: Neocallimastigomycota
- Class: Neocallimastigomycetes
- Order: Neocallimastigales
- Family: Neocallimastigaceae
- Genus: Piromyces; J.J.Gold, I.B.Heath & Bauchop (1988)

Type species
- Piromyces communis J.J.Gold, I.B.Heath & Bauchop (1988)

Species
- P. citronii Gaillard et al. 1995; P. communis (Liebetanz 1910) Gold, Heath & Bauchop 1988; P. cryptodigmaticus Fliegerová, Voigt & Kirk 2012; P. dumbonicus Li 1990; P. finnis O'Malley, Haitjema & Gilmore 2016; P. irregularis Fliegerová, Voigt & Kirk 2015; P. mae Li 1990; P. minutus Ho 1993; P. polycephalus; P. rhizinflatus Breton et al. 1991; P. spiralis Ho 1993

Genus of fungi

Piromyces is a genus of fungi in the family Neocallimastigaceae.

== Piromyces sp. E2 physiology and genome ==
Piromyces sp. E2 is a eukaryotic species belonging to the phylum Chytridiomycota, which comprises organisms that possess flagellated zoospores, making them unique among the fungi.

These obligate anaerobic chytrid fungi lack mitochondria, possessing instead hydrogenosomes (hydrogen- and ATP-producing organelles), representing a unique order (the Neocallismasticales) within the chytrids.

These anaerobic symbionts play a key role in the herbivore digestive tract by providing hydrogen for the bacterial species living in the herbivore gut, but also by aiding with the digestion of plant cell wall material, converting cellulose to glucose and other simple sugars, making them available for the host and for other symbiotic species.
