= Neocallimastix =

Scientific classification
- Domain: Eukaryota
- Kingdom: Fungi
- Division: Neocallimastigomycota
- Class: Neocallimastigomycetes
- Order: Neocallimastigales
- Family: Neocallimastigaceae
- Genus: Neocallimastix; Vavra & Joyon ex I.B.Heath (1983)

Type species
- Neocallimastix frontalis (R.A.Braune) Vavra & Joyon ex I.B.Heath (1983)

Species
- N. californiae O'Malley, Theodorou & Solomon 2016; N. cameroonii Griffith, Dollhofer & Callaghan 2015; N. frontalis (Braune 1913) Vávra & Joyon 1966 ex Heath 1983; N. hurleyensis Theodorou & Webb 1991; N. joyoni Breton et al. 1988; N. lanati Wilken et al. 2021; N. patriciarum Orpin & Munn 1986; N. variabilis Ho & Barr 1993

Genus of fungi

Neocallimastix is a genus of obligately anaerobic rumen fungi in the family Neocallimastigaceae. A specialised group of chytrids grow in the rumen of herbivorous animals, where they degrade cellulose and thus play a primary role in the complex microbial ecology of the rumen.
