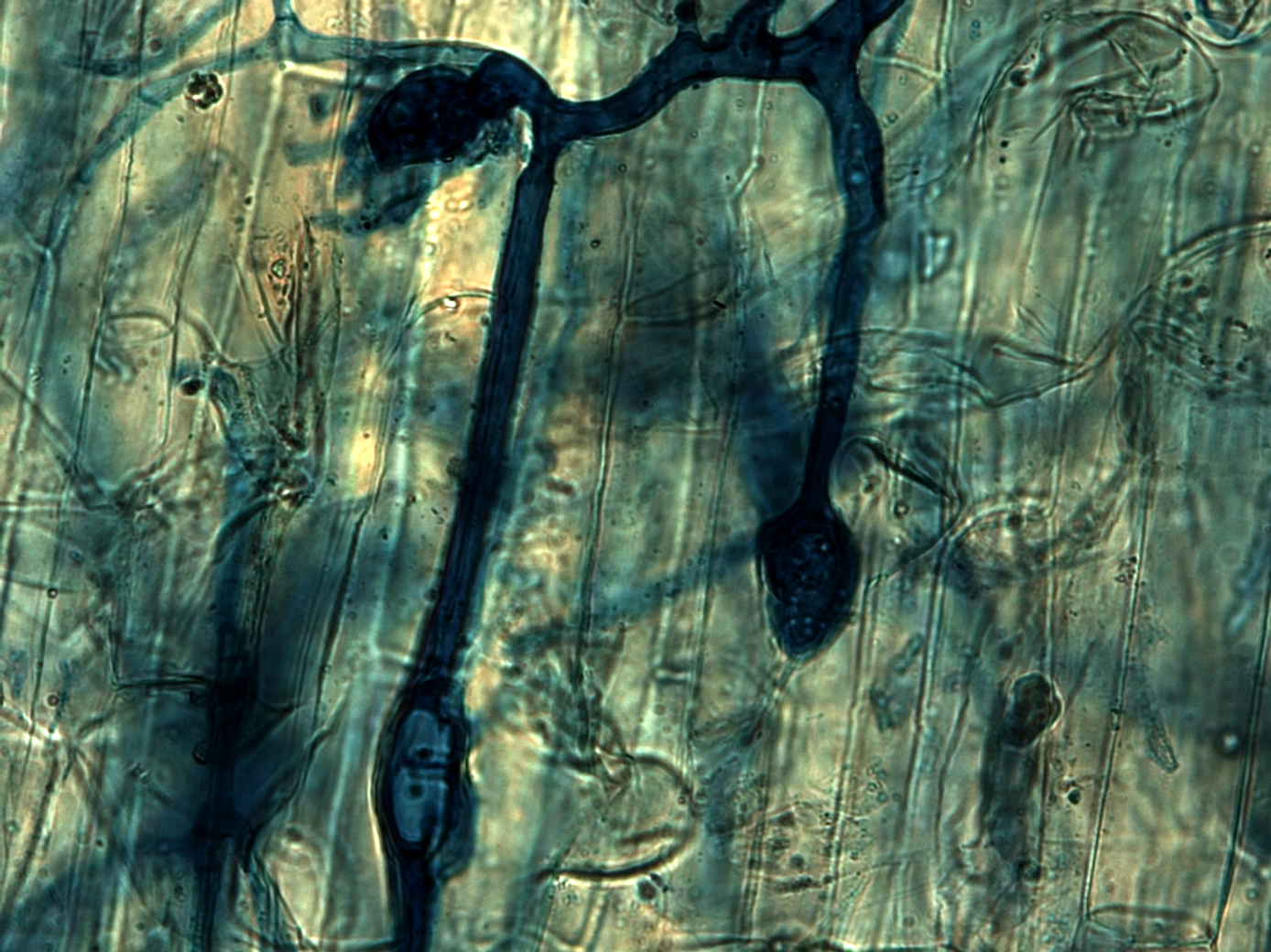
- mycorrhized roots of Vicia faba with Rhizophagus irregularis

Scientific classification
- Kingdom: Fungi
- Division: Glomeromycota
- Class: Glomeromycetes
- Order: Glomerales
- Family: Glomeraceae
- Genus: Rhizophagus
- Species: R. irregularis

Binomial name
- Rhizophagus irregularis (Błaszk., Wubet, Renker & Buscot) C. Walker & A. Schüßler 2010

Synonyms
- Glomus irregulare Błaszk., Wubet, Renker & Buscot, (2009); Rhizoglomus irregulare (Błaszk., Wubet, Renker & Buscot) Sieverd., G.A. Silva & Oehl (2015); Rhizophagus irregulare (Blaszk., Wubet, Renker & Buscot) C. Walker & A. Schüßler (2010)

= Rhizophagus irregularis =

Arbuscular mycorrhizal fungus used as a soil inoculant

Rhizophagus irregularis (previously known as Glomus intraradices) is an arbuscular mycorrhizal fungus used as a soil inoculant in agriculture and horticulture. Rhizophagus irregularis is also commonly used in scientific studies of the effects of arbuscular mycorrhizal fungi on plant and soil improvement. Until 2001, the species was known and widely marketed as Glomus intraradices, but molecular analysis of ribosomal DNA led to the reclassification of all arbuscular fungi from Zygomycota phylum to the Glomeromycota phylum.

== Description ==
=== Spores ===
- Color — white, cream, yellow-brown
- Shape — elliptical with irregularities
- Size — generally between 40–140 μm

=== Hyphae ===
- Shape — Cylindrical or slightly flared
- Size — Width: 11–18 μm

=== Identification ===
Rhizophagus irregularis colonization peaks earlier than many of the other fungi in Rhizophagus. There tends to be extensive hyphal networking and intense intraradical spores associated with older roots of host plants.

At times the spores are densely clustered or patchily distributed, depending on the host species. When the spores are heavily clustered, mycorrhizologists and others will tend to mistake R. irregularis for G. fasciculatum.

=== Reproduction ===
Rhizophagus irregularis (previously known as Glomus intraradices) has been found to colonise new plants by means of spores, hyphae or fragments of roots colonized by the fungus

=== Meiosis and recombination ===
Arbuscular mycorrhiza (AM) fungi were thought to have propagated clonally for over 500 million years because of their lack of visible sexual structures and thus were considered to be an ancient asexual lineage. However, homologs of 51 meiotic genes, including seven genes specific for meiosis were found to be conserved in the genomes of five AM species including Rhizophagus irregularis (referred to by its synonym designation Glomus irregulare). This observation suggests that the supposedly ancient asexual AM fungi are likely capable of undergoing a conventional meiosis. R. irregularis dikaryons also appear to be capable of genetic recombination.

== Ecology and distribution ==
=== Distribution ===
Rhizophagus irregularis can be found in almost all soils, especially those populated with common host plants and in forests and grasslands.

This is a brief list of some common host plants. Most agricultural crops will benefit from Rhizophagus irregularis inoculation. Generally host plants must be vascular plants, but not always.

- Onion — Allium cepa L.
- Soapbush Wattle — Acacia holosericea
- Flax — Linum usitatissimum L.
- Cowpea — Vigna unguiculata
- Tomato Plant — Lycopersicon esculentum
- Albaida — Anthyllis cytisoides

=== Conservation and status ===
Rhizophagus irregularis is not of conservation concern; however, individual populations could be harmed by agricultural chemicals and tillage.

== Relevance ==
In numerous scientific studies R. irregularis has been shown to increase phosphorus uptake in multiple plants as well as improve soil aggregation due to hyphae.

Because of these qualities, R. irregularis is commonly found in mycorrhizal based fertilizers.

In a 2005 study, R. irregularis was found to be the only arbuscular mycorrhizal fungi that was able to control nutrient uptake amounts by individual hyphae depending on differing phosphorus levels in the surrounding soil.
