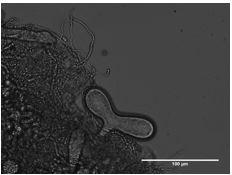

Scientific classification
- Kingdom: Fungi
- Division: Neocallimastigomycota
- Class: Neocallimastigomycetes
- Order: Neocallimastigales
- Family: Neocallimastigaceae
- Genus: Anaeromyces
- Species: A. robustus

Binomial name
- Anaeromyces robustus O'Malley, Theodorou & Henske (2016)

= Anaeromyces robustus =

Fungus living in the gut of cows and sheep

Anaeromyces robustus is a fungal microorganism that lives in the gut rumen of many ruminant herbivores such as cows and sheep. Previously thought to be protozoa from their flagellated zoospores, they are biomass degraders, breaking down carbohydrates and plant materials from the food the animal ingests. This fungus, therefore, is anaerobic and lives without oxygen. Gut fungi are dramatically outnumbered by other organisms in the microbiome; they are members of the gut microbiome in ruminants and hindgut fermenters and play a key role in digestion.

== Taxonomy ==
Initially, this fungal species was isolated from sheep fecal material in the Santa Barbara Zoo in 2017. It fit into the division of Neocallimastigomycota, as all species within this order live in the gut rumen of large herbivores.

== Description ==
A. robustus is characterized by its long hyphal segments and its ability to reproduce asexually from flagellated zoospores. With the production of zoospores, this fungus's lifecycle is very representative of species of fungi from the phylum Chitridiomycota. This fungus has polycentric sporangia development as many sporangia develop throughout the thallus. With this, there is also nucleus movement through many repeated divisions through the rhizoids.

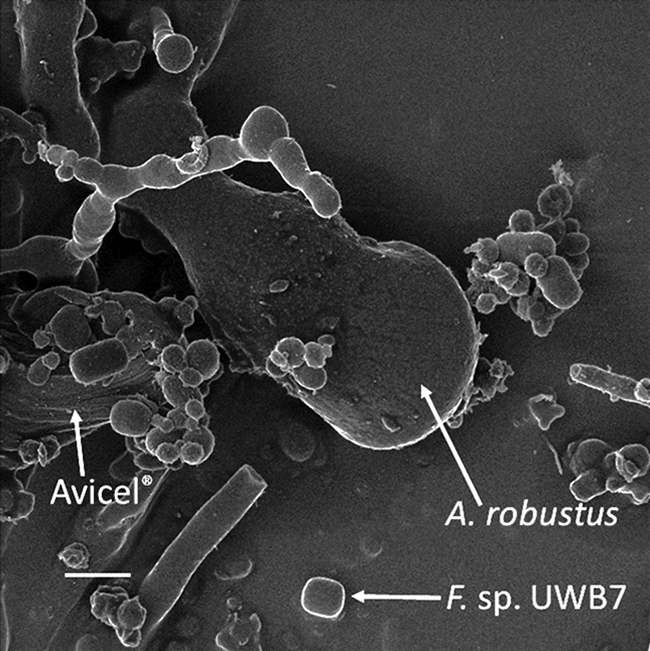
A. robustus grown in culture media (Bowen, Benjamin P., etal)

== Ecology ==
This fungus helps animals with the digestion of plant materials. Certain enzymes produced from A. robustus have significantly more enzymatic activity when compared to bacteria and other organisms inside of gut rumen. There is a species of archaea, Methanobacterium bryantii, that increases the fungus's ability to break down carbohydrates by increasing the CAZyme production of the fungus. When exposed to harmful gut bacteria, rumen fungi are known to produce their own antibiotics, making them potentially useful when looking into synthesizing new antibiotics.

Horizontal gene transfer (HGT) has been thought to have occurred between fungal ruminants, like A. robustus, and bacteria that are found in the same environment. Through this gene transfer, it is thought that it has adopted some of the biosynthetic genes the fungus uses to break down carbohydrates from certain bacteria.

Anaerobic gut fungi can create a compound called styrylprone that is typically found in other mushrooms that can be used for herbal medicine. This compound has similarities to antioxidants that are found in a plethora of plants.

== Geographical distribution ==
The fungus was found in the United States and around the country in many large ruminants and hind-gut fermenters. One reference states that A. robustus and other ruminomyces were found in fecal samples from many cows and goats in Oklahoma. Another reference states the fungus was found in fecal samples of sheep in the Santa Barbara Zoo in 2017.

== In rumen ==
Ruminant animals such as cattle, sheep, and goats have a specialized four-chamber stomach, the largest chamber of which is known as the rumen. Rumen contains a plethora of microorganisms that are responsible for the breakdown of fibrous materials. This symbiotic relationship allows ruminants to utilize nutrients from plants that other species are unable to digest.

Anaeromyces robustus is found in relatively low quantities compared to many bacterial microorganisms within the rumen; however, this fungus has been shown to play a significant role in ruminant digestion through the production of xylanase. A large proportion of plants have a compound known as xylan within the hemicellulose in their cell walls. This compound can make it difficult for animals to utilize the nutrients within the cell. The xylanase, produced by Anaeromyces robustus, is able to efficiently break down the xylan within plant cell walls, allowing ruminant animals to utilize the nutrients in fibrous feedstuffs. Little is known about its genomics or the secondary metabolites it is responsible for producing. Some sources have hypothesized that this fungus produces metabolites within the rumen that help the microorganism survive in an environment where it is largely outnumbered by bacteria.

== Use in bread making ==
The gene within the fungus that produces xylanase has been identified in the lab for potential use in food production. The introduction of this gene into flour used in baking has been shown to make the bread softer. The fermentation temperatures required by the fungus are shown to closely match those required by yeast, another common component in bread.
