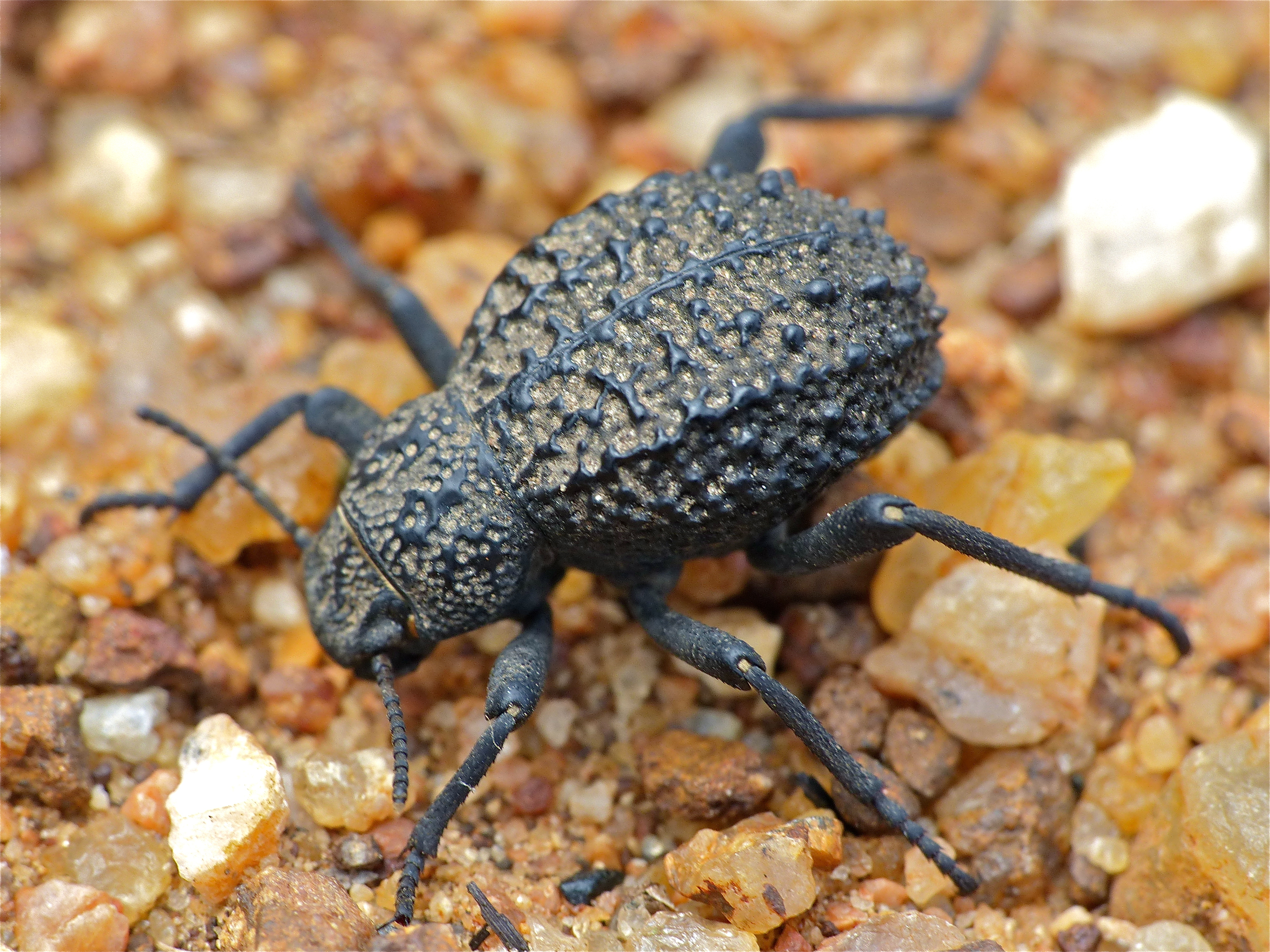
- R. reticulata in Limpopo

Scientific classification
- Kingdom: Animalia
- Phylum: Arthropoda
- Class: Insecta
- Order: Coleoptera
- Suborder: Polyphaga
- Infraorder: Cucujiformia
- Family: Tenebrionidae
- Tribe: Adesmiini
- Genus: Renatiella; Carl Koch, 1944

= Renatiella =

Genus of beetles

Renatiella is a genus of diurnal, herbivorous beetles, which is found from East to southern Africa.

== Species ==
The species include:

- Renatiella fettingi (Gebien) – Namibia to southwestern Angola
- Renatiella gebieni Koch, 1948
- Renatiella macradesmioides Koch, 1948
- Renatiella neumanni Kuntzen, 1915
- Renatiella regneri Kuntzen, 1915
- Renatiella reticulata (Gerstäcker, 1854) – Tanzania to South Africa
  - Renatiella reticulata subsp. rukwana (Kuntzen)
- Renatiella scrobipennis Haag-Rutenberg, 1875 – Namibian near-endemic
- Renatiella tuberculipennis Haag, 1875
