= Caecomyces =

Scientific classification
- Domain: Eukaryota
- Kingdom: Fungi
- Division: Neocallimastigomycota
- Class: Neocallimastigomycetes
- Order: Neocallimastigales
- Family: Neocallimastigaceae
- Genus: Caecomyces; J.J.Gold (1988)

Type species
- Caecomyces equi J.J.Gold (1988)

Species
- Caecomyces communis Caecomyces equi Caecomyces sympodialis

Genus of fungi

Caecomyces is a genus of fungi in the family Neocallimastigaceae.
