= Anaeromyces =

Scientific classification
- Kingdom: Fungi
- Division: Neocallimastigomycota
- Class: Neocallimastigomycetes
- Order: Neocallimastigales
- Family: Neocallimastigaceae
- Genus: Anaeromyces; Breton, Bernalier, Dusser, Fonty, B.Gaillard & J.Guillot (1990)

Type species
- Anaeromyces mucronatus Breton, Bernalier, Dusser, Fonty, B.Gaillard & J.Guillot (1990)

Species
- A. contortus Hanafy et al. 2018; A. elegans (Ho 1990) Ho 1993; A. mucronatus (Ho 1990) Ho 1993; A. polycephalus (Chen, Chien & Hseu 2002) Fliegerová, Voigt & Kirk 2012; A. robustus O'Malley, Theodorou & Henske 2016

Synonyms
- Ruminomyces Ho 1990

Genus of fungi

Anaeromyces is a genus of fungi in the family Neocallimastigaceae.
