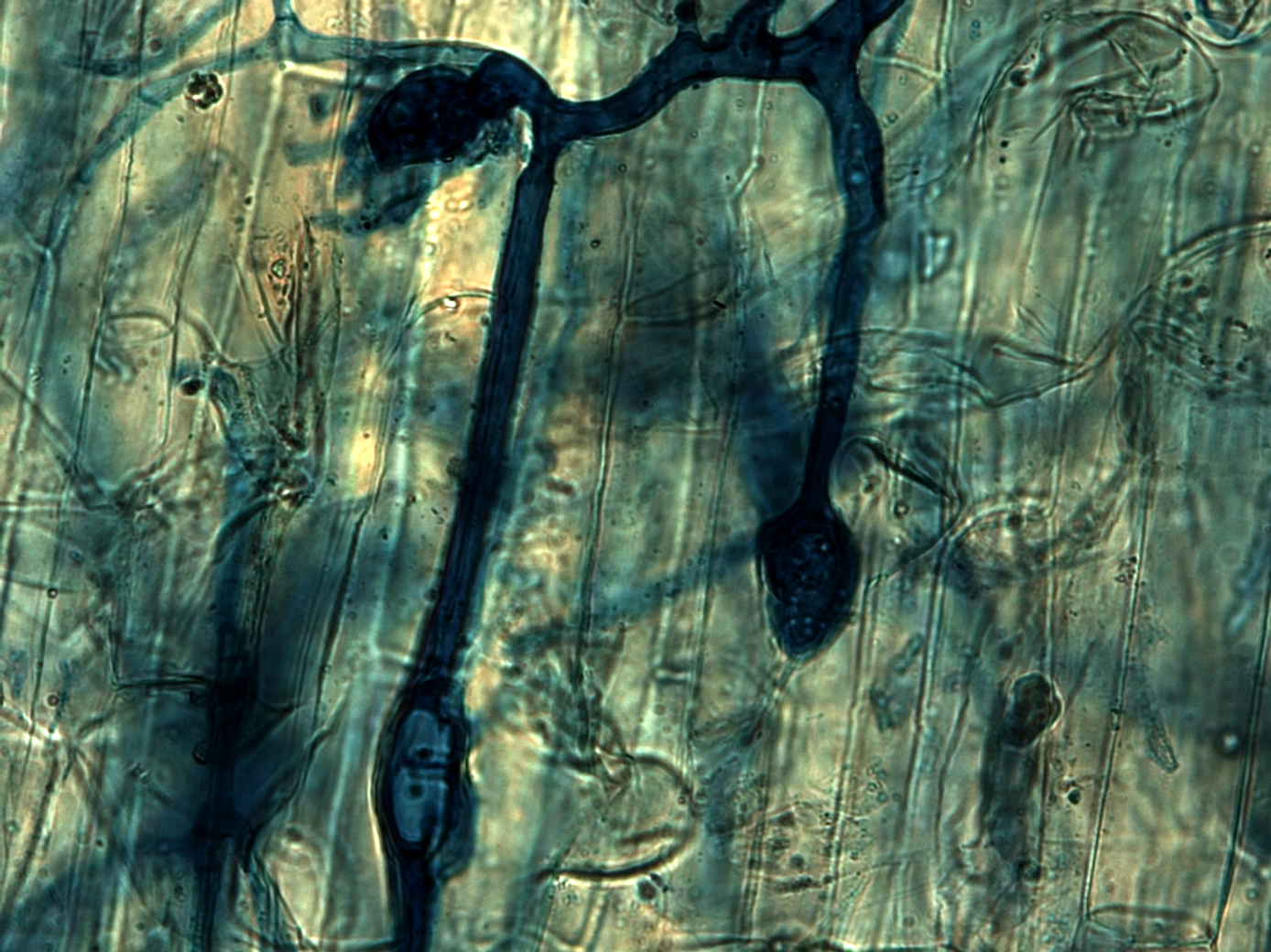
- Rhizophagus irregularis mycelia in the cells of plant host Vicia faba

Scientific classification
- Kingdom: Fungi
- Division: Glomeromycota
- Class: Glomeromycetes
- Order: Glomerales
- Family: Glomeraceae
- Genus: Rhizophagus; P.A. Dang. 1896

Species
- Rhizophagus arabicus; Rhizophagus clarus (T.H. Nicolson & N.C. Schenck) C. Walker & A. Schüßler; Rhizophagus custos (C. Cano & Dalpé) C. Walker & A. Schüßler; Rhizophagus diaphanum (J.B. Morton & C. Walker) C. Walker & A. Schüßler; Rhizophagus fasciculatus (Thaxt.) C. Walker & A. Schüßler; Rhizophagus intraradices (N.C. Schenck & G.S. Sm.) C. Walker & A. Schüßler; Rhizophagus iranicus (Blaszk., Kovács & Balázs) C. Walker & A. Schüßler; Rhizophagus irregularis (Blaszk., Wubet, Renker & Buscot) C. Walker & A. Schüßler; Rhizophagus manihotis (R.H. Howeler, Sieverd. & N.C. Schenck) C. Walker & A. Schüßler; Rhizophagus proliferus (Dalpé & Declerck) C. Walker & A. Schüßler

= Rhizophagus (fungus) =

Genus of fungi

Rhizophagus is a genus of arbuscular mycorrhizal (AM) fungi that form symbiotic relationships (mycorrhizas) with plant roots. The genome of Rhizophagus irregularis (formerly Glomus intraradices) was recently sequenced.
