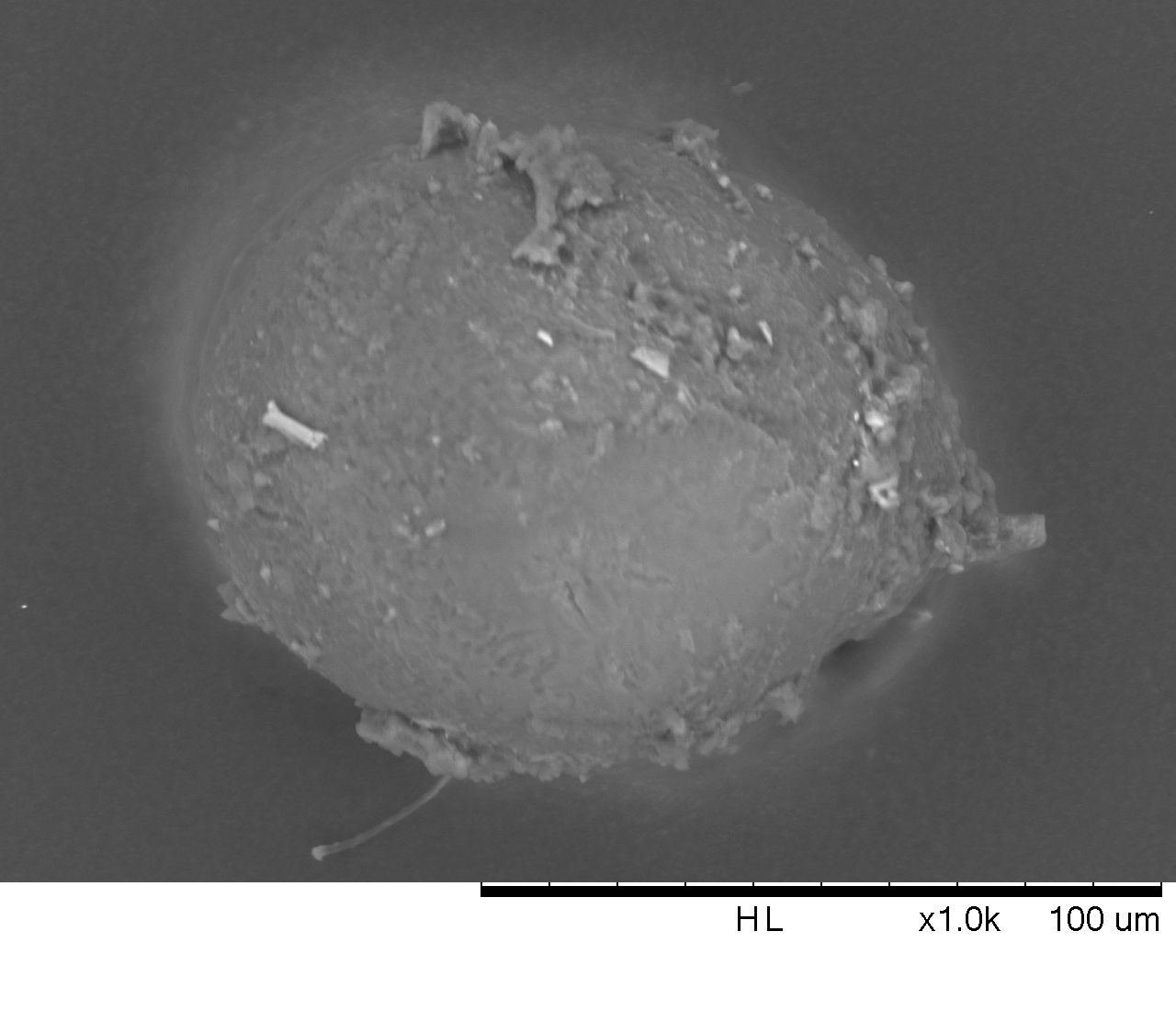
- Glomus mosseae

Scientific classification
- Domain: Eukaryota
- Kingdom: Fungi
- Division: Glomeromycota
- Class: Glomeromycetes
- Order: Glomerales; Morton & Benny, 1990

Families and genera
- Glomeraceae: Funneliformis; Funneliformis caledonius; Funneliformis coronatus; Funneliformis mosseae; Glomus; Glomus cerebriforme; Glomus macrocarpum; Palaeoglomus↑; Palaeoglomus boullardi↑; Palaeoglomus grayi†; Palaeoglomus strotheri†; Rhizophagus; Rhizophagus clarus; Rhizophagus intraradices; Rhizophagus irregularis; Rhizophagus proliferus; Sclerocystis; Septoglomus; Septoglomus constrictum; Claroideoglomeraceae: Claroideoglomus; Claroideoglomus claroideum; Claroideoglomus drummondii; Claroideoglomus etunicatum; Claroideoglomus luteum; Claroideoglomus walkeri

Synonyms
- Glomales

= Glomerales =

Glomerales Temporal range: 460–0 Ma

Order of fungi

Glomerales is an order of symbiotic fungi within the phylum Glomeromycota.

== Biology ==
These fungi are all biotrophic mutualists. Most employ the arbuscular mycorrhizal method of nutrient exchange with plants. They produce large (.1-.5mm) spores (azygospores and chlamydospores) with thousands of nuclei.

== Phylogeny ==
All members of their phylum were once thought to be related to the Endogonaceae, but have been found through molecular sequencing data, to be a closer relation to the Dikarya. Their fossil record extends back to the Ordovician period (460 million years ago).

== Meiosis ==
Glomerales fungi were thought to have reproduced clonally for several hundred million years and are therefore an ancient asexual lineage. However, homologs of 51 meiotic genes, including seven genes specific for meiosis, were found to be conserved in the genomes of four Glomus species. Thus it now appears that these supposedly ancient asexual fungi may be capable of meiosis and perhaps also of a cryptic sexual or parasexual cycle.

== Orthography ==
The family name Glomeraceae upon which this order level name is based, was incorrectly spelled 'Glomaceae', hence the order name was incorrectly spelled 'Glomales'. Both are correctable errors, to Glomeraceae and Glomerales, as governed by the International Code of Botanical Nomenclature. The incorrect spellings are commonplace in the literature.

== See also ==
- Glomalin
