= Rhizophagus clarus =

Scientific classification
- Kingdom: Fungi
- Division: Glomeromycota
- Class: Glomeromycetes
- Order: Glomerales
- Family: Glomeraceae
- Species: R. clarus

Binomial name
- Rhizophagus clarus (T.H. Nicolson & N.C. Schenck) C. Walker & A. Schüßler

Synonyms
- Glomus clarum; Rhizoglomus clarum

Species of fungus

Rhizophagus clarus (previously known as Glomus clarum) is an arbuscular mycorrhizal fungus in the family Glomeraceae. The species has been shown to improve nutrient absorption and growth in several agricultural crops but is not typically applied commercially.

== Distribution and conservation ==
Rhizophagus clarus is widely distributed and found worldwide. The species is proposed to be at the level of Least Concern on the IUCN Red List due to its global distribution.

== Spores and morphology ==
The spores of Rhizophagus clarus vary in color from white to yellow-brown. They naturally vary in size from 100 to 260 μm and are globose to subglobose in shape. The spores are larger than the spores of other species in the genus Rhizophagus. The spores are composed of an outer mucilaginous layer which thickens as they mature.

Rhizophagus clarus is composed of extraradical hyphae that extend past the rhizosphere soil zone, and intraradical hyphae that inhabit the host plant's roots.

== Ecology ==
Rhizophagus clarus is a biotrophic mutualist fungus that exchanges soil nutrients with its host plant for photoassimilates.

Rhizophagus clarus is able to form a symbiotic relationship with a wide variety of plant hosts, some of which include:

- Strawberry (Fragaria x ananasa Duch.)
- Maize (Zea mays)
- Soybean (Glycine max)
- Cotton (Gossypium hirsutum)
- Spearmint (Mentha crispa)
- Tomato (Solanum lycopersicum)

== Genome ==
Rhizophagus clarus has a relatively small number of genes coding for cell wall degrading enzymes because the species is mutualistic and not pathogenic. Effector molecules secreted by the fungus affect plant signaling and immune function to promote fungal colonization. Hyphal anastomosis is common in colonies of Rhizophagus clarus and allows for horizontal gene transfer and increased variation in genotypes.
