= Neocallimastigomycota =

Scientific classification
- Kingdom: Fungi
- Division: Neocallimastigomycota; M.J. Powell 2007
- Class: Neocallimastigomycetes; M.J. Powell 2007
- Order: Neocallimastigales; J.L. Li, I.B. Heath & L. Packer
- Family: Neocallimastigaceae

Type genus
- Neocallimastix (I.B. Heath 1983) Vavra & Joyon

Genera
- Aestipascuomyces; Agriosomyces; Aklioshbomyces; Anaeromyces; Buwchfawromyces; Caecomyces; Capellomyces; Cyllamyces; Feramyces; Ghazallomyces; Liebetanzomyces; Joblinomyces; Khoyollomyces; Neocallimastix; Oontomyces; Orpinomyces; Paucimyces; Pecoramyces; Piromyces; Tahromyces

Family of fungi

Neocallimastigomycota are a phylum containing anaerobic fungi, which are symbionts found in the digestive tracts of larger herbivores. Anaerobic fungi were originally placed within phylum Chytridiomycota, within Order Neocallimastigales but later raised to phylum level, a decision upheld by later phylogenetic reconstructions. It encompasses only one family.

== Discovery ==
The fungi in Neocallimastigomycota were first recognised as fungi by Orpin in 1975, based on motile cells present in the rumen of sheep. Their zoospores had been observed much earlier but were believed to be flagellate protists, but Orpin demonstrated that they possessed a chitin cell wall. It has since been shown that they are fungi related to the core chytrids. Prior to this, the microbial population of the rumen was believed to consist only of bacteria and protozoa. Since their discovery they have been isolated from the digestive tracts of over 50 herbivores, including ruminant and non-ruminant (hindgut-fermenting) mammals and herbivorous reptiles.

Neocallimastigomycota have also been found in humans.

== Reproduction and growth ==
These fungi reproduce in the rumen of ruminants through the formation of zoospores which are released from sporangia. These zoospores bear a kinetosome but lack the nonflagellated centriole known in most chytrids, and have been known to utilize horizontal gene transfer in their development of xylanase (from bacteria) and other glucanases.

The nuclear envelopes of their cells are notable for remaining intact throughout mitosis. Sexual reproduction has not been observed in anaerobic fungi. However, they are known to be able to survive for many months in aerobic environments, a factor which is important in the colonisation of new hosts. In Anaeromyces, the presence of putative resting spores has been observed but the way in which these are formed and germinate remains unknown.

== Metabolism ==
Neocallimastigomycota lack mitochondria, but instead contain hydrogenosomes, where oxidation of NADH to NAD+ leads to H_{2} formation.

== Polysaccharide-degrading activity ==
Neocallimastigomycota play an essential role in fibre-digestion in their host species. They are present in large numbers in the digestive tracts of animals which are fed on high fibre diets. The polysaccharide degrading enzymes produced by anaerobic fungi can hydrolyse the most recalcitrant plant polymers and can degrade unlignified plant cell walls entirely. Orpinomyces sp. exhibited the capacity of xylanase, CMCase, lichenase, amylase, β-xylosidase, β-glucosidase, α-Larabinofuranosidase and minor amounts of β-cellobiosidase production by utilizing avicel as the sole energy source. The polysaccharide degrading enzymes are organised into a multiprotein complex, similar to the bacterial cellulosome.

== Spelling of name ==
The Greek termination, "-mastix", referring to "whips", i.e. the many flagella on these fungi, is changed to "-mastig-" when combined with additional terminations in Latinized names. The family name Neocallimastigaceae was originally incorrectly published as "Neocallimasticaceae" by the publishing authors which led to the coinage of the misspelled, hence incorrect "Neocallimasticales", an easily forgiven error considering that other "-ix" endings such as Salix goes to Salicaceae. Correction of these names is mandated by the International Code of Botanical Nomenclature, Art. 60. The corrected spelling is used by Index Fungorum. Both spellings occur in the literature and on the WWW as a result of the spelling in the original publication.
