= Yolande Dalpé =

Botanist

- Born: 1948 (age 77–78); Waterloo, QC, Canada
- Education: Université Toulouse III - Paul Sabatier
- Known for: Mycology
- Awards: Lawson Medal
- Scientific career
- Workplaces: Agriculture and Agri-Food Canada

Yolande Dalpé is a former Research Scientist with Agriculture and Agri-Food Canada. She became the first mycologist in Ottawa to study the taxonomy of mycorrhizal fungi. Her research focuses on developing new information on taxonomy, phylogeny, distribution and biology of fungi, including systematic research related to biosecurity/alien invasive species as well as species involved in the development of bioproducts. She was awarded the Lawson Medal by the Canadian Botanical Association for her "cumulative, lifetime contributions to Canadian botany, for the research she has performed in mycology, and has been recognized nationally and internationally." Over her career, she published extensively and contributed to training scientists in fungal identification and taxonomy, earning national and international recognition.

== Biography ==
Yolande Dalpé was born in Waterloo, Quebec in 1948. In 1989 she received her Doctorate of Science (D.Sc.) in the Physiology of Fungi from Université Paul-Sabatier in Toulouse, France. After completing her D.Sc. Dalpé was hired as a research scientist at Agriculture and Agri-Food Canada (AAFC) in 1981.

== Career ==
Yolande Dalpé last worked as the program leader of the mycology section at the Ottawa Research and Development Centre in Ottawa, Ontario.

Her projects included:

- Fungi: Develop new information on taxonomy, phylogeny, distribution and biology of fungi, including systematic research related to biosecurity/alien invasive species as well as species involved in the development of bioproducts.
- Build and maintain reference collections and databases of fungi: Glomeromycota in vitro Collection (GINCO); AAFC Vascular Plant Herbarium (DAO) and National Mycological Herbarium (DAOM). Support for Canadian Collection of Fungal Cultures (CCFC).
- Development of phylogenomics capability, rapid detection and identification tools.
- Accurate identification, information and related training for scientific research in taxonomy, fungi propagation and biodiversity protection.

Yolande Dalpé is an associate editor of the journal Botany published by the National Research Council of Canada. She is also an adjunct professor associated with the Quebec Centre for Biodiversity Science, a network that fosters and promotes a research and training program in biodiversity science. She has trained numerous scientists and graduate students in the identification and taxonomy of arbuscular mycorrhizal fungi and has published over 130 scientific papers.

Yolande Dalpé is a founding member of the International Mycorrhiza Society (IMS), a scientific society involved in the advancement of education, research and development in the area of mycorrhizal symbiosis between plants and specialized soil fungi. She is a member of IMS' Board of Directors and is also the editor of Mycorrhiza, the official scientific journal of the society.

Yolande Dalpé is an administrator of an amateur mycologist association for the Outaouais, Quebec region called Mycologues Amateurs de l'Outaouais (MAO). MAO is dedicated to the dissemination of knowledge in mycology, picking wild mushrooms, their identification and their consumption. Dalpé is also the editor of MAO's newsletter.

She is the "person in charge" of the Glomeromycota In vitro Collection Canada (GINCO-CAN) an organization that "shares the biological material of its collection and related informations as well as its experience and know-how in the field of arbuscular mycorrhizal fungi research to the benefit of its partners and clients in the scientific and industrial sectors."

== Honours and awards ==
In 2013 Dalpé received the Lawson Medal by the Canadian Botanical Association for her "cumulative, lifetime contributions to Canadian botany, for the research she has performed in mycology, and has been recognized nationally and internationally."
