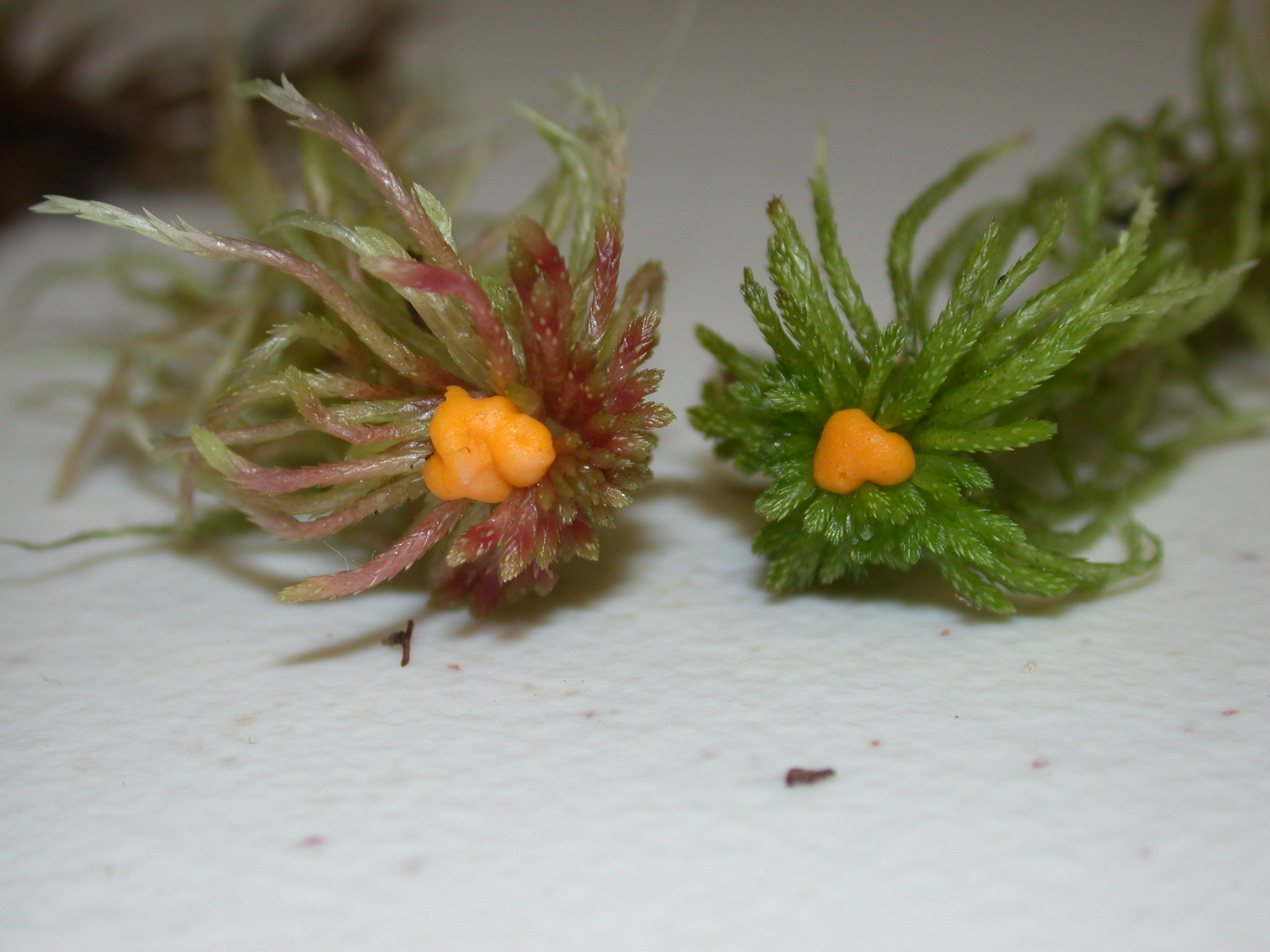
- Fruiting body of Endogone pisiformis
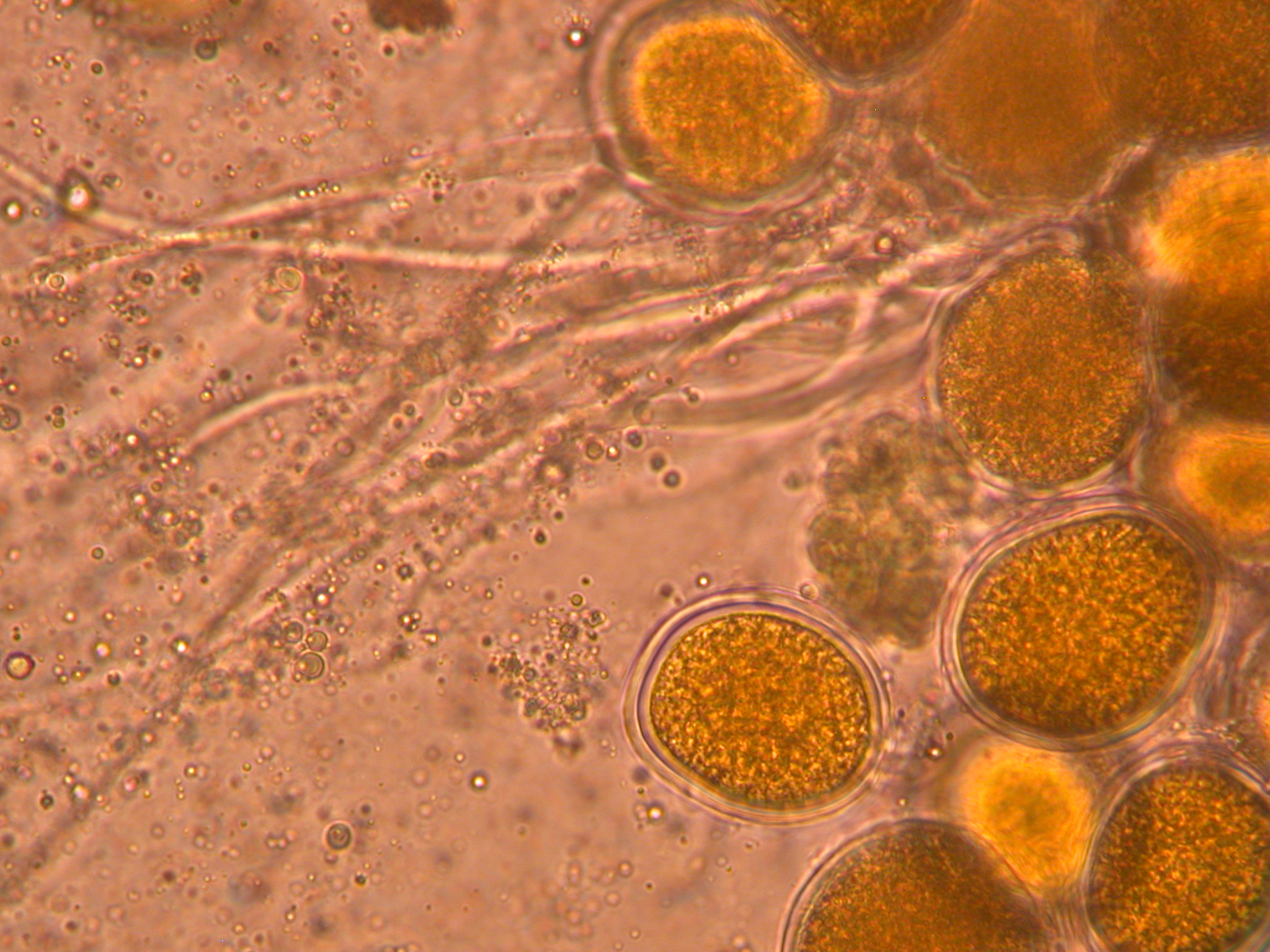
- Double-walled zygospores of E. pisiformis

Scientific classification
- Domain: Eukaryota
- Kingdom: Fungi
- Division: Mucoromycota
- Class: Endogonomycetes
- Order: Endogonales
- Family: Endogonaceae
- Genus: Endogone; Link (1809)

Type species
- Endogone pisiformis Link (1809)

Species
- ~25, see text

= Endogone =

Genus of fungi

Endogone is a genus of fungi in the family Endogonaceae of the division Mucoromycota. The genus has a widespread distribution, especially in temperate regions, and contains about 20 species.

Species of Endogone form underground structures called sporocarps—fruiting structures measuring between a few millimeters to 2–3 cm (0.8–1.2 in) in diameter, containing densely interwoven hyphae and zygospores. Sporocarps are typically found in humus-rich soil or leaf mold, or in mosses. Although most species will only produce spores in nature, the type species E. pisiformis can be made to sporulate in test tube culture when grown with conifer seedlings.

== Taxonomy ==
Endogone was first circumscribed by Johann Heinrich Friedrich Link in an 1809 publication. In 1922, Roland Thaxter revised the taxonomy of the family Endogonaceae, recognizing four genera: Endogone, Sphaerocreas, Sclerocystis, and Glaziella. In 1935, Herbert Zycha transferred the sole species of Sphaerocreas recognized by Thaxter to Endogone. In their 1974 monograph of the Endogonaceae, James Gerdemann and James Trappe deviated from Thaxter’s concept of Endogone, which contained taxa with chlamydospores and zygospores, including only those species that formed zygospores in sporocarps. In the mid-1990s, Yi-Jian Yao and colleagues further restricted Endogone to those species that produced suspensors that were in contact with one another along the entire length. Those taxa in which the suspensors did not touch one another were transferred to a new genus, Youngiomyces.

The generic name is derived from the Greek words endo (inside) and gone (reproductive organs).

== Description ==
Endogone species are sporocarpic—they form a fruit body termed a sporocarp, on which spore-bearing structures are borne. The zygospores—a diploid reproductive stage in the life cycle—are formed above the point of union of two gametangia, or from a budding from the larger of the two. Species in the genus can be saprobic, ectomycorrhizal, or both.

== Ecology ==
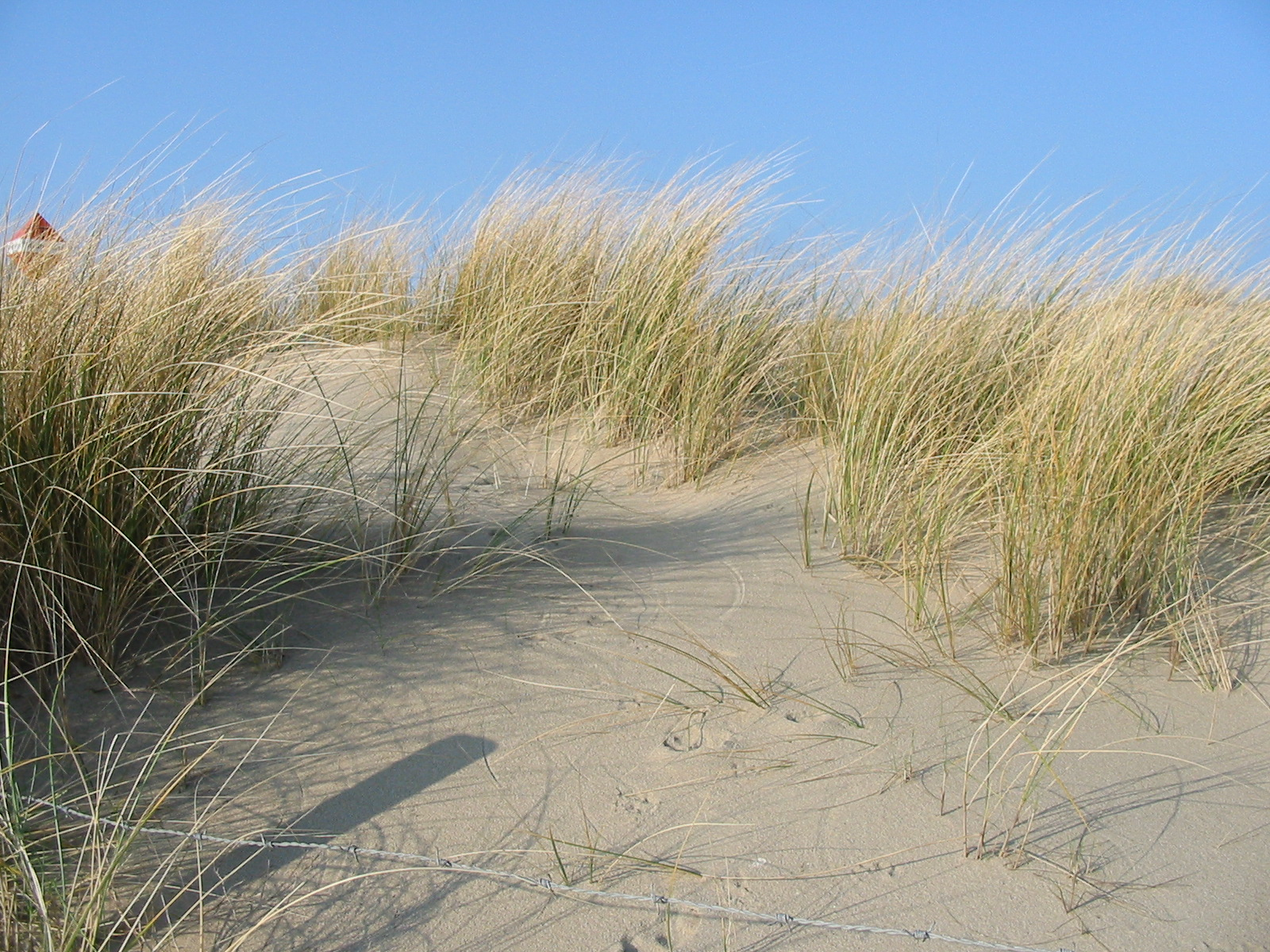
Endogone species are important in the ecology of plant succession in sand dunes

Depending on the species, sporocarps have been noted to have the odor of onions, burnt sugar, or fish. Endogone grows in soil, on rotting wood, sphagnum or other plant material either as saprobes or ectomycorrhizal associates. Endogone is especially important in the ecology of nutrient-poor soils. For example, Endogone fungi are known to grow in sand dunes, a nutrient-deficient substrate. Dune plants are dependent upon the fungus for growth and ecological success: the mycelium of the fungus helps aggregate and stabilize the sand in a network of hyphae, giving it cohesion and helping early succession plants establish roots. It also traps and binds fragments of organic material such as decaying roots and rhizomes.

Various species of rodents and shrews include Endogone fungi in their diets, including the southeastern shrew (Sorex longirostris), the masked shrew (Sorex cinereus), the vagrant shrew (Sorex vagrans), the woodland jumping mouse (Napaeozapus insignis), the Siskiyou chipmunk (Tamias siskiyou), and the marsh rice rat (Oryzomys palustris).

== Species ==
- E. acrogena Gerd., Trappe & Hosford 1974
- E. aggregata P.A.Tandy 1975 – Australia
- E. alba (Petch) Gerd. & Trappe 1974
- E. arenaria Thaxt. 1922
- E. aurantiaca Blaszk. 1997
- E. crassa P.A.Tandy 1975 – Australia
- E. flammicorona Trappe & Gerd. 1972
- E. incrassata Thaxt. 1922
- E. irregularis Szem. 1965
- E. kaiseriana Henn. 1908
- E. lactiflua Berk. 1846
- E. lanata Harkn. 1899
- E. maritima Blaszk., Tadych & Madej 1998
- E. minutissima Beeli 1924 – Europe
- E. oregonensis Gerd. & Trappe 1974
- E. pegleri Y.J.Yao 1995
- E. pisiformis Link 1809
- E. pseudopisiformis Y.J.Yao 1995
- E. reticulata P.A.Tandy 1975 – Australia
- E. rosea Zeller 1941
- E. sphagnophila G.F.Atk. 1918
- E. tjibodensis Boedijn 1935
- E. torrendii Bres. 1920
- E. tuberculosa Lloyd 1918
- E. verrucosa Gerd. & Trappe 1974
- E. xylogena J.Schröt. 1887
