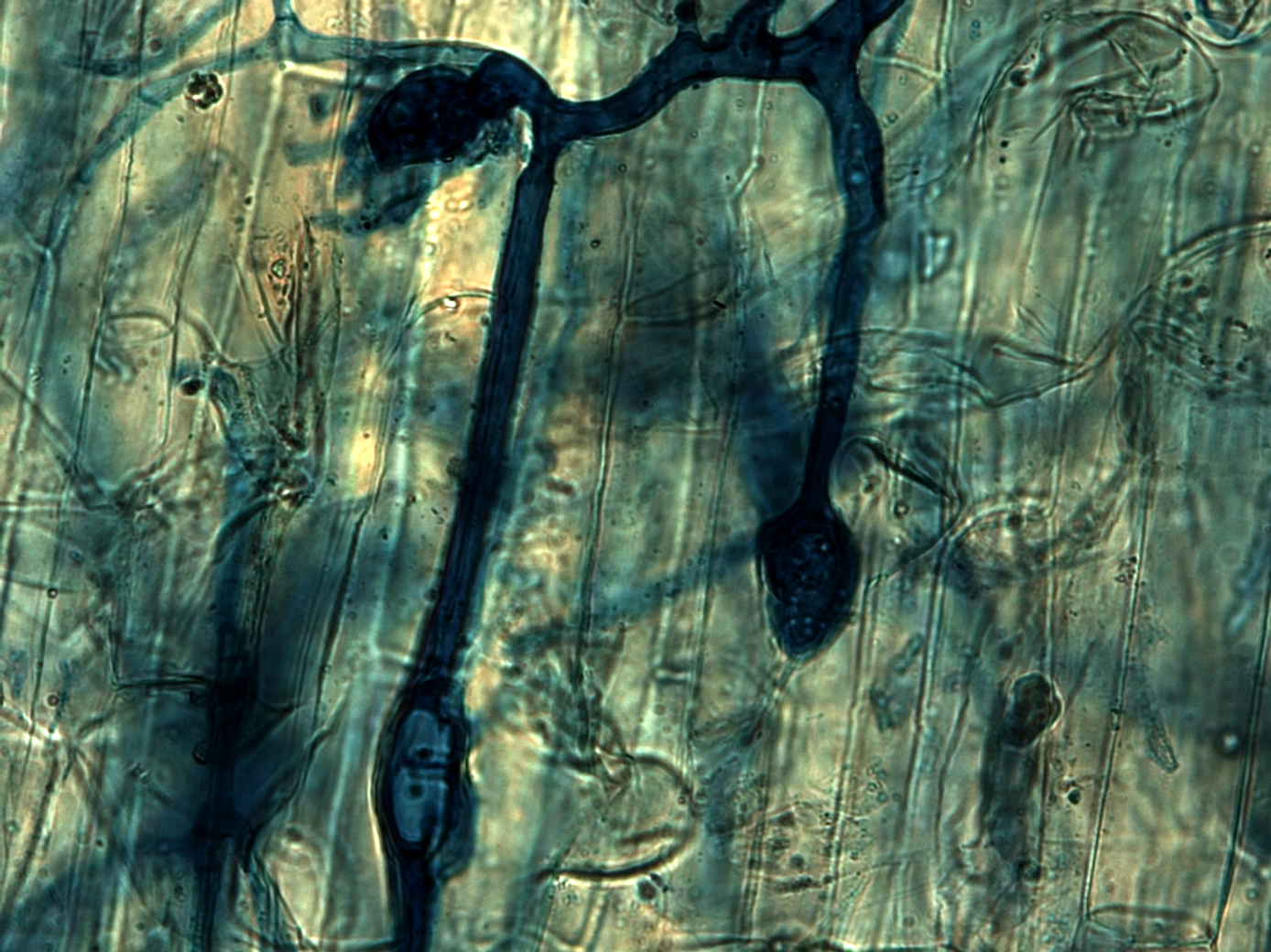
- Rhizophagus irregularis mycelia in the cells of plant host Vicia faba

Scientific classification
- Kingdom: Fungi
- Division: Glomeromycota
- Class: Glomeromycetes
- Order: Glomerales
- Family: Glomeraceae; Piroz. & Dalpé (1989)

Type genus
- Glomus Tul. & C.Tul. (1845)

Genera
- Funneliformis; Glomus; Rhizophagus; Sclerocystis; Septoglomus

Synonyms
- Glomaceae

= Glomeraceae =

Family of fungi

The Glomeraceae are a family of arbuscular mycorrhizal (AM) fungi that form symbiotic relationships (mycorrhizas) with plant roots. The family was circumscribed in 1989. Some species of Glomeraceae have been found to aid in the growth of some legumes and trees where the fungi was present.
