= Venera Obolashvili =

Soviet-Georgian serial killer

- Born: 1954 (age 71–72); Georgian SSR (present-day Georgia)
- Other name: Lela Javakhishvili
- Convictions: Murder; Fraud
- Penalty: 23 years imprisonment

Details
- Victims: 1–3
- Span of crimes: 1984 – 2009 (suspected)
- Country: Soviet Union, later Georgia
- State: Tbilisi
- Date apprehended: December 15, 2009

Venera Obolashvili (Georgian: ვენერა ობოლაშვილი; born 1954) is a Soviet-Georgian murderer, fraudster and self-confessed serial killer who murdered a female relative in 2009 in order to sell her apartment - she also confessed to killing one of her husbands and a boyfriend but was never charged due to a lack of evidence. Found guilty of one murder and sentenced to 23 years imprisonment, she was released on parole in 2023.

== Early life ==
Little is publicly available about Obolashvili's life. Born in 1954 in the Georgian SSR, she would go on to marry to three separate husbands and have three children, although she would also live with boyfriends on common-law grounds. Sources report that graduated university and held a license as a dentist, but is not known to have practised professionally.

== Murders ==
=== Yuri Yurkin ===
The first suspicious death linked to Obolashvili dates back to 1984, with the death of her 43-year-old husband Yuri Yurkin. Officially, he was thought to have died after accidentally falling of a train near Tbilisi, but after her arrest, Obolashvili claimed that she had pushed him to his death. After this, she sold his apartment for the equivalent of $4,000.

=== Anatoli Kalinka ===
No other serious crime was allegedly committed by Obolashvili until 2008, when she started dating 52-year-old Anatoli Kalinka. According to her testimony, one day she hit him on the head and dragged the unconscious man to a bridge, where she threw him into the Kura River. Kalinka's body was found not long after, but his death was written off as an unfortunate accident. Obolashvili later sold his apartment for $50,000.

=== Maria Arzamaseva ===
By 2009, Obolashvili was living with 79-year-old Maria Arzamaseva, who had been her uncle's girlfriend for some time. In August of that year, they invited a young man over to discuss selling the apartment, but according to Obolashvili, Arzamaseva got drunk and chased him away, claiming that this was her home.

Angered by this encounter, Obolashvili confronted Arzamaseva and the two got into an argument. During their scuffle, Obolashvili strangled Arzamaseva and then put her body on the bed, before going out to buy a large sack to stuff her body in. With the help of a cab driver - who was unaware that there was a body inside - she transported it a factory and dumped it into a sewer. The sack containing Arzamaseva's body was later washed ashore, but she was mistaken for a homeless woman and buried in a pauper's grave.

== Arrest and trial ==
Soon after her death, Obolashvili successfully sold Arzamaseva's apartment to a stranger, using the money to pay off some of her debts and buy a new Audi. Unbeknownst to her, bank employees noticed that there was something suspicious going on with her purchases, as she was using Arzamaseva's credit cards. As a result, she was arrested on December 15, 2009, and charged with forgery and fraud, but a murder charge was soon added after it was established that Arzamaseva had been killed.

It was quickly established that both her husband and boyfriend had died in similarly suspicious circumstances, but as prosecutors lacked sufficient evidence to charge her in these cases, Obolashvili was charged solely with the murder of Arzamaseva and the corresponding fraud charges. During her trial, she claimed that her death was an accident, but her claims were disregarded and she was found guilty on all counts. As a result, the court sentenced Obolashvili to 23 years imprisonment.

=== Imprisonment and release ===
During her time in prison, Obolashvili was initially avoided by fellow inmates due her notoriety, but eventually managed to befriend some with whom she developed a strong bond. She claims that during her time in prison, she spent most of her studying and learning new skills, earning a total of 27 certificates in different fields. Obolashvili also claims that she got two master's degrees in automation and agrobiology from two separate Russian universities and to be fluent in English and German.

In late January 2023, Obolashvili was released on parole after serving less than half of her original sentence. Upon her release, she gave an exclusive interview to a local news outlet in which she told of her life in prison and apparently expressed remorse over her actions.
