= MiR394 microRNA precursor family =

Short RNA molecule

miR394

Identifiers
- Symbol: miR394
- Rfam: RF00688
- miRBase family: MIPF0000100

Other data
- RNA type: microRNA
- Domain: Viridiplantae
- PDB structures: PDBe

In molecular biology, miR394 is a conserved plant microRNA that regulates gene expression by directing cleavage or translational repression of specific target mRNAs.

miR394 is widely conserved among flowering plants and has been studied in species including Arabidopsis thaliana and Solanum lycopersicum. One well-characterized target of miR394 is the gene LEAF CURLING RESPONSIVENESS (LCR), which encodes an F-box protein involved in regulating leaf morphology and developmental processes.

Expression studies suggest that miR394 may also participate in nutrient signaling pathways, including responses to phosphate availability and interactions with arbuscular mycorrhizae in plants.

== See also ==
- MicroRNA
