= Mohamed Hijri =

Biologist

Dr. Mohamed Hijri is a biologist who studies arbuscular mycorrhizal fungi (AMF). He is a professor of biology and research at the Institut de recherche en biologie végétale at the University of Montreal.

== Early life and education ==
Mohamed Hijri obtained his Bachelor’s of Science in Cell Biology in 1994 from the University of Burgundy in France. He went on to earn his Master’s of Science in Biochemistry, Molecular and Cell Biology at the University of Burgundy in 1995. In 1999, Hijri obtained his PhD in Biochemistry, Molecular and Cell Biology from the University of Burgundy. His PhD project studied the organization of the genetic polymorphism of the arbuscular mycorrhizal fungus Scutellospora castanea. He completed his doctoral research at the INRA Dijon Centre in Dijon, France. In 1999, Hijri joined the lab of Ian Sanders at the University of Basel in Switzerland as a postdoctoral fellow. His work in Sanders’ lab focused on molecular genetics and the evolution of arbuscular mycorrhizal fungi. He moved to the University of Lausanne in Switzerland with the Sanders lab in 2000 and continued his work as a postdoctoral fellow with the Sanders lab until 2005. In September 2005, Hijri joined the Institut de recherche en biologie végétale (IRBV) and the Department of Biological Sciences of the University of Montreal as an assistant professor. In June 2016, he was promoted to his current position as full professor in the Department of Biological Sciences at the University of Montreal.

== Career and research ==
Currently, Hijri works as a professor of biology and research in the Department of Biological Sciences at the University of Montreal. He conducts research out of the Hijri Lab at the Plant Biology Research Institute (IRBV) at the university. His research aims to understand the genetic structure, evolution, and reproduction of arbuscular mycorrhizal fungi (AMF). AMF help to improve plant growth by increasing the roots’ ability to absorb phosphorus and boosting resistance to pathogens. In 2013, Hijri hosted a TED Talk where he spoke of the depletion of phosphorus in modern agriculture. Phosphorus is a crucial element for DNA, cell communication, and plant health. Dr. Hijri’s research has found that when phosphorus fertilizer is added to crops, the plants retain only about 15% of the phosphorus. Hijri proposes AMF as the solution to this inefficiency. The mycorrhiza (AMF) expands the plant’s root network to seek out phosphorus, and adding mycorrhizae to plant soil results in better yield. AMF is a completely natural way to retain phosphorus and improve farming.

Hijri’s research has also explored the abilities of certain plants and microscopic mushrooms to decontaminate sites. As with agricultural crops, the mushroom expands the plants’ root networks and contributes to fast, successful growth in contaminated sites. After several plant cycles, the site is eventually cleansed through the successful growth of the plants.

Hijri describes himself as a “dreamer.” His research has the potential to change the future of farming and more broadly, the future of the planet. The Hijri Lab at the University of Montreal is currently working on projects related to mitochondrial genomics, environmental microbiology, molecular genetics, plant-microbe interactions, and microbial ecology.

== Awards and honors ==
Hijri has attracted over $30 million in research grants from organizations like the Natural Sciences and Engineering Research Council of Canada for studies that he has initiated and led. Hijri’s work has also been funded by Genome Quebec. In February 2013, Hijri was a special guest at the Canadian Parliament in Ottawa, Canada on invitation by the Canada Foundation for Innovation. Hijri is also a member of the International Mycorrhiza Society.

== Publications ==
Hijri has published numerous papers and been cited in many different articles. He co-authored a book published in 2018 titled Mycorrhiza in tropical and neotropical ecosystems. Some of his most cited papers are listed below.

- Genome of an arbuscular mycorrhizal fungus provides insight into the oldest plant symbiosis, 2015, Proceedings of the National Academy of Sciences
- Evidence for the evolution of multiple genomes in arbuscular mycorrhizal fungi, 2001, Nature
- The transcriptome of the arbuscular mycorrhizal fungus Glomus intraradices (DAOM 197198) reveals functional tradeoffs in obligate symbiont, 2012, New Phytologist
- Low gene copy number shows that arbuscular mycorrhizal fungi inherit genetically different nuclei, 2005, Nature
- Linkage between bacterial and fungal rhizosphere communities in hydrocarbon-contaminated soils is related to plant phylogeny, 2014, The ISME Journal

== Other interests ==
In addition to his research, Hijri participates in running marathons. In 2016, he finished the Boston Marathon in 2 hours and 57 minutes.
