= PLFA =

PLFA may refer to:

- Phospholipid-derived fatty acids
- Polish American Football League
