= Arum type =

Arum-type refers to the morphology of fungal hyphae living in, or around plant root cells.

- Forms in arbuscular or tree-like fashion, branching off dichotomously at predetermined junctions.

This is a type of mycorrhizal infection whereby the fungus in question invaginates the cell membrane of a plant cell, and branches in arbuscular manner. Arum-type growth of hyphae is used in endomycorrhizal symbiosis with a plant.

- Often, but not always, accompanied by intercellular hyphal growth.

== See also ==
- Arbuscular mycorrhizal fungi
- Paris type
