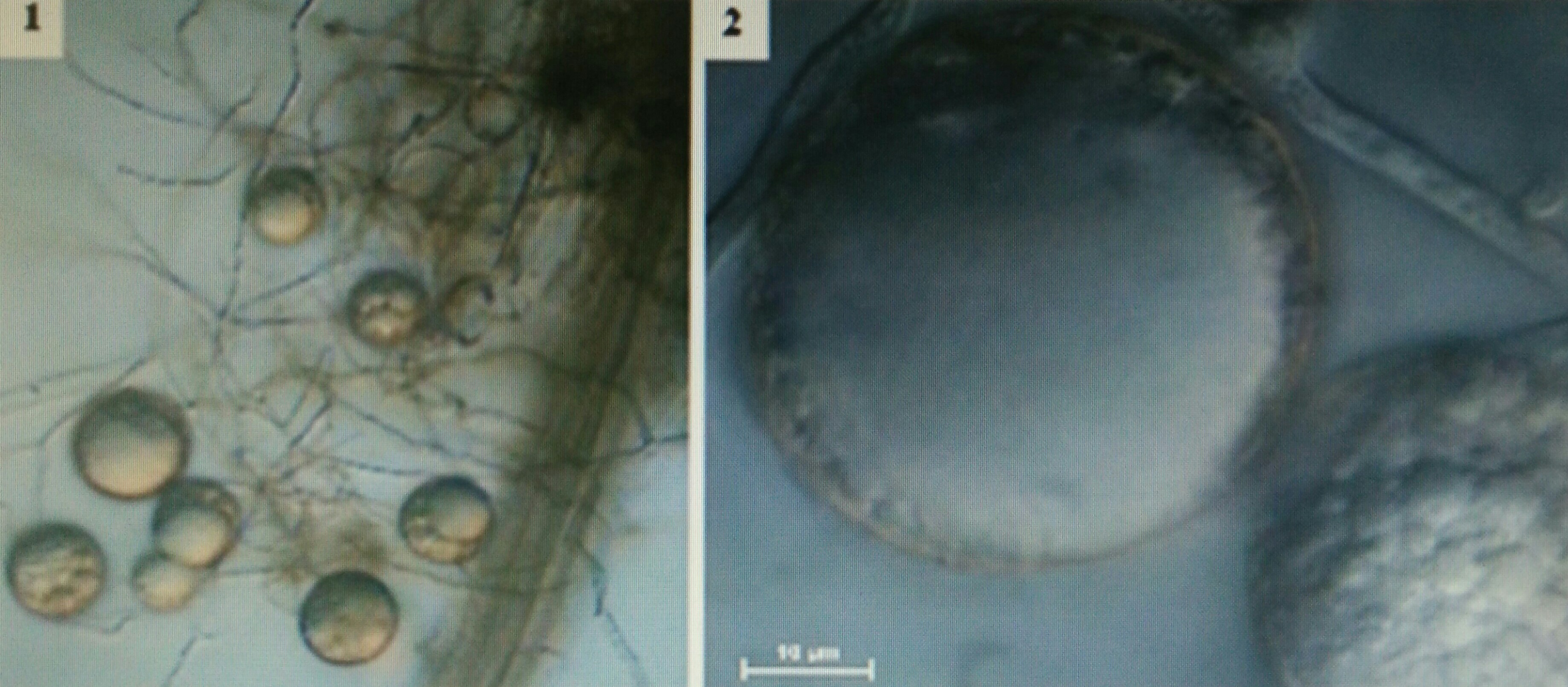
- Photomicrographs of Glomus iranicum var. tenuihypharum. External mycelial network and extra-root spores (1) and details of walls of individual spores (2)

Scientific classification
- Domain: Eukaryota
- Kingdom: Fungi
- Division: Glomeromycota
- Class: Glomeromycetes
- Order: Glomerales
- Family: Glomeraceae
- Genus: Glomus
- Species: G. iranicum
- Variety: G. i. var. tenuihypharum

Trinomial name
- Glomus iranicum var. tenuihypharum Vic.-Sánch., E.Nicolás, Pedrero, J.J.Alarcón, Maestr.-Val. & F.Fernández

= Rhizophagus iranicus var. tenuihypharum =

Variety of fungus

Glomus iranicum var. tenuihypharum is an arbuscular mycorrhizal fungus (AMF) that helps improve the physiochemical conditions of the soil and stimulates growth and productivity of the majority of plants. This species, isolated from an alkaline pH 9.5 soil with high concentrations of Mg, Ca and Mn salts, achieves good symbiosis with the majority of agricultural plants, including those under intensive agricultural conditions. It produces abundant extramatrical mycelium that can explore large volumes of soil, reproduces through spores generated inside the root, facilitates good transport of nutrients within the roots of the plant and tolerates high concentrations of nutritional salts in the soil, exhibiting good tolerance to the fertilisation protocols of intensive agriculture.

Because of its biological properties, Symborg, the discovering company of this species, has obtained a patent on it, the first that protects a species of AMF.

Scientific studies have been performed and published in specialised journals about the effects of this species on various types of crops. In the specific case of table grapes, repeated increases of 12-45% of total production have been achieved over more than three years for the varieties Red Globe, Crimson, Napoleón, Thomson seedless, etc., with sustained improvements in fruit quality. Increases in the length and weight of the bunches, greater colour uniformity and higher degrees Brix of the harvested fruit have been found.

In horticultural crops, it promotes significant increases in physiological activity (better water status and gas exchange) and productivity (10-15%) of the treated plants, whether cultivated in a greenhouse or in the open field. A study of the root system of the melon, performed by the Polytechnic University of Cartagena in Spain, showed that the application of this fungal species not only increased the root exploration surface after stimulation of fine rootlets but also induced a change in root architecture, encouraging higher nutrient absorption. There were significant increases in potential productivity

In greenhouse-grown peppers, studies showed not only an increase in production (1 kg per m^{2}) but also a significant control of plant endogenous hormone expression. At the start of cultivation there was an increase in auxin (indoleacetic acid) expression for greater production of roots and mycorrhizal colonisation, higher expression of gibberellins and cytokines resulting in more leaf development and production after 50 days of growth and a significant reduction of abscisic acid favouring more youthful plants toward the end of the cycle.

In cereal and grain production such as corn and soybeans, colonisation with this species enables production increases of over 10%.
