= Nitrogen nutrition in the arbuscular mycorrhizal system =

Nitrogen nutrition in the arbuscular mycorrhizal system refers to...

== Role of nitrogen ==
Nitrogen is a vital macronutrient for plants, necessary for the biosynthesis of many basic cellular components, such as DNA, RNA and proteins. Nitrogen is obtained by plants through roots from inorganic or organic sources, such as amino acids. In agricultural settings, nitrogen may be a limiting factor for plant growth and yield, and in total, as a critical cellular component that a plant deficient in this nitrogen will shunt resources away from its shoot in order to expand its root system so that it can acquire more nitrogen. Arbuscular mycorrhizal fungi are divided into two parts depending on where the mycelium is located. The intra-radical mycelia (IRM) are found within the root itself while the extra-radical mycelium (ERM) are tiny hyphal threads which reach far out into the soil. The IRM is the site of nutrient exchange between the symbionts, while the ERM effectively serves as an extension of the plant's root system by increasing the surface area available for nutrient acquisition, including nitrogen, which can be taken up in the form of ammonium, nitrate or from organic sources. Working with an in vitro system, studies have shown that as much as 29% to 50% of the root nitrogen was taken up via the fungus. This is also true in in planta studies, such as an experiment in which the researchers showed that 75% of the nitrogen in a young maize leaf originated from the ERM.

=== Mechanism of action ===
The precise mechanism(s) by which nitrogen is taken up from the soil by the ERM, transported to the IRM, and then turned over to the plant are still under investigation. Toward elucidating the mechanisms through which nitrogen transfer is completed, the sum of numerous studies have provided the necessary tools to study this process. For example, the detection and measurement of gene expression has enabled researchers to determine which genes are up-regulated in the plant and fungus under various nitrogen conditions. Another important tool is the use of the nitrogen isotope [[^{15}N]], which can be distinguished from the more common ^{14}N isotope. Nitrogen-containing compounds thus labeled can be tracked and measured as they move through the fungus and into the plant, as well as how they are incorporated into nitrogen-containing molecules.

The current model, first put forth in 2005, proposes that the nitrogen taken up by the fungus is converted in the ERM to arginine, which is then transported to the IRM, where it is released as ammonium into the apoplast for the plant to use. A growing body of data has supported and expanded upon this model. Support has been found primarily in two ways: labeling experiments and the study of gene expression, as demonstrated in a 2010 paper by Tian et al. When labeled nitrogen compounds were added to the ERM compartment of an in vitro bsystem, six fungal genes encoding enzymes involved in the incorporation of inorganic nitrogen into glutamine and its subsequent conversion to arginine were rapidly up-regulated. After a delay, gene expression in the IRM began to show increasing levels of mRNA for genes involved in the breakdown of arginine into urea and the subsequent cleaving of ammonium from the urea molecule. This change in gene expression takes place concurrently with the arrival of ^{15}N labeled arginine from the ERM compartment.

Once inside the ERM, the nitrogen molecule may have to travel many centimeters to reach the root. While much progress has been made on either end of the transfer of nitrogen, the mechanism by which the arginine actually moves from the ERM to the IRM remains unresolved. AM fungi are non-septate and lack cell walls between cells, forming one long filament. However, passive flow through the continuous cytoplasm is too slow to explain the transport of nutrients. The mechanism by which the newly manufactured arginine is transported to the plant requires further investigation.

=== Community and ecology ===
A single plant with its associated fungus is not an isolated entity. It has been shown that mycelia from the roots of one plant actually colonize the roots of nearby plants, creating an underground network of plants of the same or different species. This network is known as a common mycorrhizal network (CMN). It has been demonstrated that nitrogen is transferred between plants via the hyphal network, sometimes in large amounts. For example, Cheng and Baumgartner found that about 25% of the labeled nitrogen supplied to a source plant, in this case a grass species, was transferred to the sink plant, grapevine. It is widely believed that these hyphal networks are important to local ecosystems and may have agricultural implications.

Some plants, called legumes, can form simultaneous symbiotic relationships with both AM fungi and the nitrogen-fixing bacteria Rhizobia. In fact, both organisms trigger the same pathways in plants during early colonization, indicating that the two very different responses could share a common origin. While the bacteria can supply nitrogen, they cannot provide other benefits of AM fungi; AM actually enhances bacterial colonization, probably by supplying extra phosphorus for the formation of the bacterial habitat within the plant, and thus contributing indirectly to the plant's nitrogen status. It is not known if there is signaling between the two, or only between the plant and each microbe. There is almost certainly competition between the bacterial and fungal partners, whether directly or indirectly, due to the fact that both are dependent on the plant as their sole source of energy. The plant must strive to strike a delicate balance between the maintenance of both partners based on its nutrient status.

=== Alternate theories ===
A large body of research has shown that AM fungi can, and do, transfer nitrogen to plants and transfer nitrogen between plants, including crop plants. However, it has not been shown conclusively that there is a growth benefit from AM due to nitrogen. Some researchers doubt that AM contribute significantly to plant N status in nature. In one field study, there was negligible transfer between soybeans and corn. Furthermore, AM sometimes appears to be parasitic. This has primarily been seen under conditions of high nitrogen, which is not the usual state in a natural environment. However, it has been shown that in at least one case, colonization by AM fungi under nitrogen-limiting conditions lead to decreased shoot biomass, implying that the relationship does the plant more harm than good. Likewise in a multi-plant system it would be very difficult to find the advantage to the source plants when their nutrients are being shunted to sink plants. These findings are at odds with the observed phenomenon that under conditions of low phosphorus, the degree of AM colonization is inversely proportional to nitrogen availability. Since the plant must supply all of the energy needed to grow and sustain the fungus, it seems counter-intuitive that it would do so without some benefit to itself. Further studies are definitely needed to delineate the details of the relationship between the symbionts, including a gradient of interaction that runs from mutualism to parasitism.
