= International Collection of (Vesicular) Arbuscular Mycorrhizal Fungi =

Culture Collection

The International Collection of (Vesicular) Arbuscular Mycorrhizal Fungi (INVAM) is the largest collection of living arbuscular mycorrhizal fungi (AMF) and includes Glomeromycotan species from 6 continents. Curators of INVAM acquire, grow, identify, and elucidate the biology, taxonomy, and ecology of a diversity AMF with the mission to expand availability and knowledge of these symbiotic fungi. Culturing AMF presents difficulty as these fungi are obligate biotrophs that must complete their life cycle while in association with their plant hosts, while resting spores outside of the host are vulnerable to predation and degradation. Curators of INVAM have thus developed methods to overcome these challenges to increase the availability of AMF spores.

The inception of this living collection of germplasm occurred in the 1980s and it takes the form of fungi growing in association with plant symbionts in the greenhouse, with spores preserved in cold storage within their associated rhizosphere. AMF spores acquired from INVAM have been used extensively in both basic and applied research projects in the fields of ecology, evolutionary biology, agroecology, and in restoration. INVAM is umbrellaed under the Kansas Biological Survey at The University of Kansas, an R1 Research Institution. The Kansas Biological Survey is also home to the well-known organization Monarch Watch. INVAM is currently located within the tallgrass prairie ecoregion, and many collaborators and researchers associated with INVAM study the role of AMF in the mediation of prairie biodiversity. James Bever and Peggy Schultz are the Curator and Director of Operation team, with Elizabeth Koziol and Terra Lubin as Associate Curators.

== History ==
INVAM was conceptualized and actualized by Dr. Norman Schenk, a mycologist and professor of plant pathology. In 1985, Schenk's vision was funded by the National Science Foundation to begin the International Culture Collection Vesicular Arbuscular Mycorrhizal Fungi (INVAM). Schenk started INVAM at the University of Florida, and after his retirement in 1990, the collection moved to West Virginia University, where it merged with the collection maintained by Joe Morton. By 1990, Schenk's collection included 182 accessions of 56 species, whereas Morton's collection comprised 107 isolates and 49 species. The transition of Schenk's collection from Florida to WVU presented challenges, as many cultures perished in transit. In the early years at WVU the focus of INVAM was to acquire and propagate more isolates and to improve propagation protocols. A reflection of this, the collection increased in size sixfold from 1995 to 2005. In 2021, the NSF funded the transition of INVAM to the University of Kansas, where it is under its current curatorship.

== Evolutionary origins and ecological significance of AMF ==
Arbuscular (from arbuscula, Latin for "tiny tree") mycorrhizal ("fungus-root") fungi have ancient origins as plant symbionts. The earliest fossil evidence of a glomeromycete arbuscule, the site of plant-fungi exchange, is known from the Rhynie Chert, which dates to 407 million years ago, during the Lower Devonian. This early fossil arbuscule does not occur in a plant root, but instead occurs in the lateral axis of a now-extinct plant. Arbuscule-forming fungi thus potentially preceded the existence of roots, as roots likely evolved from rhizoid-based rooting systems during the Devonian (Kenrick 2014). Some researchers even suggest that roots evolved as habitats for fungi. There is support for the hypothesis that mycorrhizal fungi and roots have coevolved in various ways, and that Glomeromycotan fungi aided in the colonization of land by plants. AMF are known to associate with at least 80% of extant land plant species, and they may benefit their host plants in a variety of important ways, including, but not limited to, increase in phosphorus and nitrogen acquisition, increased biomass, resilience against drought stress, synergy with rhizobia partners, defense priming, and perhaps most contentious is AMFs ability to convey resistance to above-ground stressors such as herbivores. Specific AMF-plant relationships can fall on various points of a mutualistic-pathogenic spectrum, depending on the associated species in the partnership, and there is evidence that there could be significant differentiation in benefit conveyed when using native vs. commercially sourced inoculum. On a landscape-wide scale, AMF have the potential to accelerate succession and increase diversity in plant communities, increase soil stability through glomalin production by the mycorrhizae, and through development of mycorrhizal networks, they increase carbon storage in the soil, thus having global implications.

== Scientific impact ==
The founder of INVAM, Dr. Norman Schenk, is coauthor of the book "Manual for the Identification of VA Mycorrhizal Fungi", a refence that is still cited today in AMF taxonomic studies. This reference describes morphological characters of AMF genera, and descriptions of then-known species, which is still useful as identification of AMF species via DNA sequencing presents difficulty as each spore can yield many Operational Taxonomic Units (OTUs). In addition to overcoming the challenges presented by propagating and storing AMF, INVAM continues to play a role in the advancement of AMF identification technologies by providing correctly identified, diverse cultures for comparison when generating a sequenced database.

- Dr. Joe Morton, second curator of INVAM, has played a role in classifying arbuscular mycorrhizal fungi, which is challenging considering both the difficulty in using DNA sequencing to differentiate between species, but also because arbuscular mycorrhizal fungi has only been known to reproduce asexually, so the well-used species concept, the Biological Species Concept (BSC), which defines a species as a group of organisms that produce fertile offspring when interbreeding, is difficult to apply.

INVAM has been cited as a resource in over 4000 scientific publications, as seen through Google Scholar.

Personnel of INVAM have aided in the establishment of other AMF culture collections in Europe with The International Bank for the Glomeromycota, South America with the International Culture Collection of Glomeromycota, and other collections in South Africa, Taiwan, and China.
