= Paris type =

Paris type is a pattern of mycorrhizal infection which is coil-like in morphology.

- These have direct intracellular growth to new cells.
- The mycoheterotrophic plants use this to their advantage, as well as in many tree species, such as acer.

== See also ==
- Arbuscular mycorrhizal fungi
- Arum type
