= Stable-isotope probing =

Stable-isotope probing (SIP) is a technique in microbial ecology for tracing uptake of nutrients in biogeochemical cycling by microorganisms. A substrate is enriched with a heavier stable isotope that is consumed by the organisms to be studied. Biomarkers with the heavier isotopes incorporated into them can be separated from biomarkers containing the more naturally abundant lighter isotope by isopycnic centrifugation. For example, ^{13}CO_{2} can be used to find out which organisms are actively photosynthesizing or consuming new photosynthate. As the biomarker, DNA with ^{13}C is then separated from DNA with ^{12}C by centrifugation. Sequencing the DNA identifies which organisms were consuming existing carbohydrates and which were using carbohydrates more recently produced from photosynthesis. SIP with ^{18}O-labeled water can be used to find out which organisms are actively growing, because oxygen from water is incorporated into DNA (and RNA) during synthesis.

When DNA is the biomarker, SIP can be performed using isotopically labeled C, H, O, or N, though ^{13}C is used most often. The density shift is proportional to the change in density in the DNA, which depends on the difference in mass between the rare and common isotopes for a given element, and on the abundance of elements in the DNA. For example, the difference in mass between ^{18}O and ^{16}O (two daltons) is twice that between ^{13}C and ^{12}C (one dalton), so incorporation of ^{18}O into DNA will cause a larger per atom density shift than will incorporation of ^{13}C. Conversely, DNA contains nearly twice as many carbon atoms (11.25 per base, on average) as oxygen atoms (6 per base), so at equivalent labeling (e.g., 50 atom percent ^{13}C or ^{18}O), DNA labeled with ^{18}O will be only slightly more dense than DNA fully labeled with ^{13}C. Similarly, nitrogen is less abundant in DNA (3.75 atoms per base, on average), so a weaker DNA buoyant density shift is observed with ^{15}N- versus ^{13}C-labeled or ^{18}O-labeled substrates. Larger buoyant density shifts are observed when multiple isotope tracers are used. Because density shifts as a predictable function of the change in mass caused by isotope assimilation, stable isotope probing can be modeled to estimate the amount of isotope incorporation, an approach called quantitative stable isotope probing (qSIP), which has been applied to microbial communities in soils, marine sediments, and decomposing leaves to compare rates of growth and substrate assimilation among different microbial taxa.

== See also ==
- Stable isotope labeling by amino acids in cell culture
