= Agrobiology =

Interdisciplinary studies of the interactions between plants and soil

Agrobiology is defined by Merriam-Webster as a field that studies how plant or crop nutrition, growth, and yield or production relate to soil management (Merriam-Webster). Agrobiology is an interdisciplinary field of study that provides a comprehensive understanding of the complex relationships between crops, soils, and the environment. Agrobiology consists of several science-based disciplines including, plant biology and nutrition, agronomy, ecology, genetics, molecular biology, and soil science. Prominent topics that involve agrobiology practices include the following but are not limited to, the role of soil microbiota in both conventional and sustainable agriculture systems, the effects of integrating livestock in sustainable agriculture systems, and the use of biotechnology and its relationship to agrobiology.

== Soil microbiota in agriculture systems ==
The plant-soil microbiome is a complex ecosystem where plants and microorganisms interact and have a role in each other's survival. It refers to the symbiotic relationship between the plants and microorganisms that live in the surrounding soil environment. The soil microbiome hosts a wide range of microorganisms including, bacteria, archaea, and fungi (NC State-Plant Soil Microbiome, n.d). The long-term effects on the soil microbiome have been studied in both conventional and sustainable agriculture practices.

Conventional agricultural practices generally include the heavy use of synthetic chemicals, monocropping systems, and the use of genetically modified organisms among other practices. Conventional systems require more input and maintenance but will generally have higher yields (Stony Brook University, n.d). Agrobiology is directly related to understanding and researching everything involving conventional and organic systems from the use of biotechnology, genetics, genetic engineering, and more.

Agrobiology studies the chemical composition of soils and plants, as well as the role that microorganisms play in the soil ecosystem. By understanding the complex interactions between different components scientists can develop strategies for maintaining soil health and fertility.
