= Glossary of mycology =

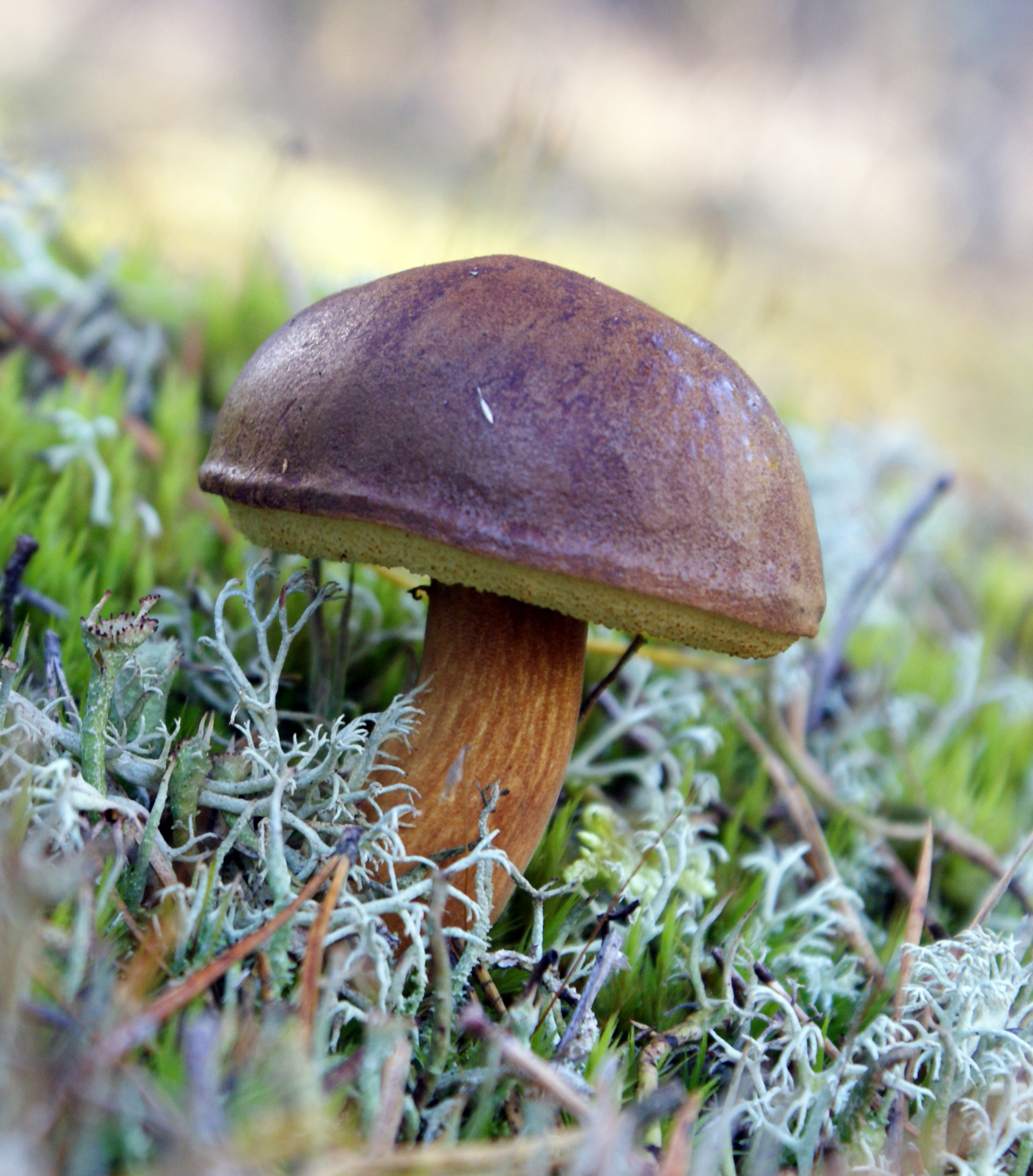
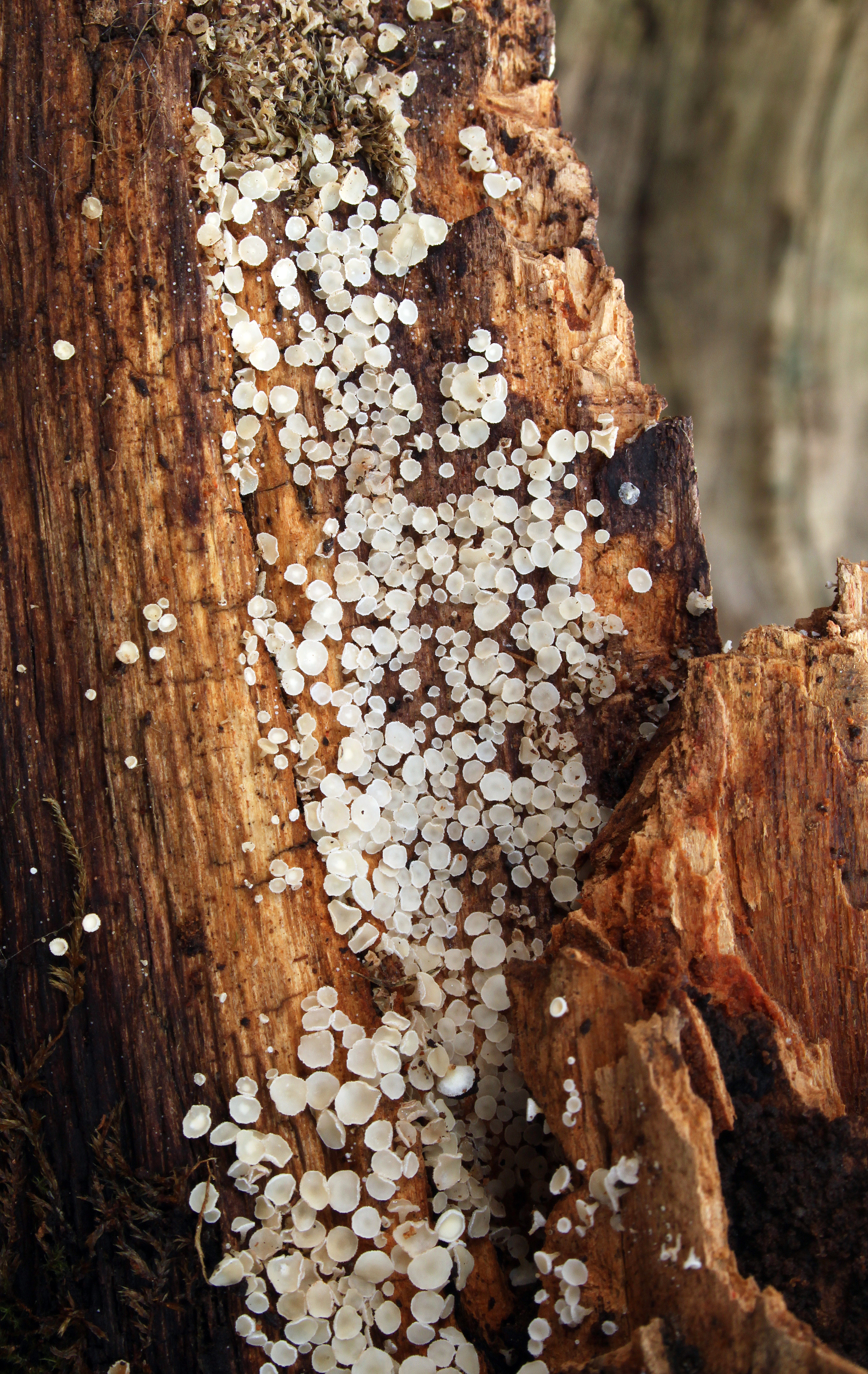
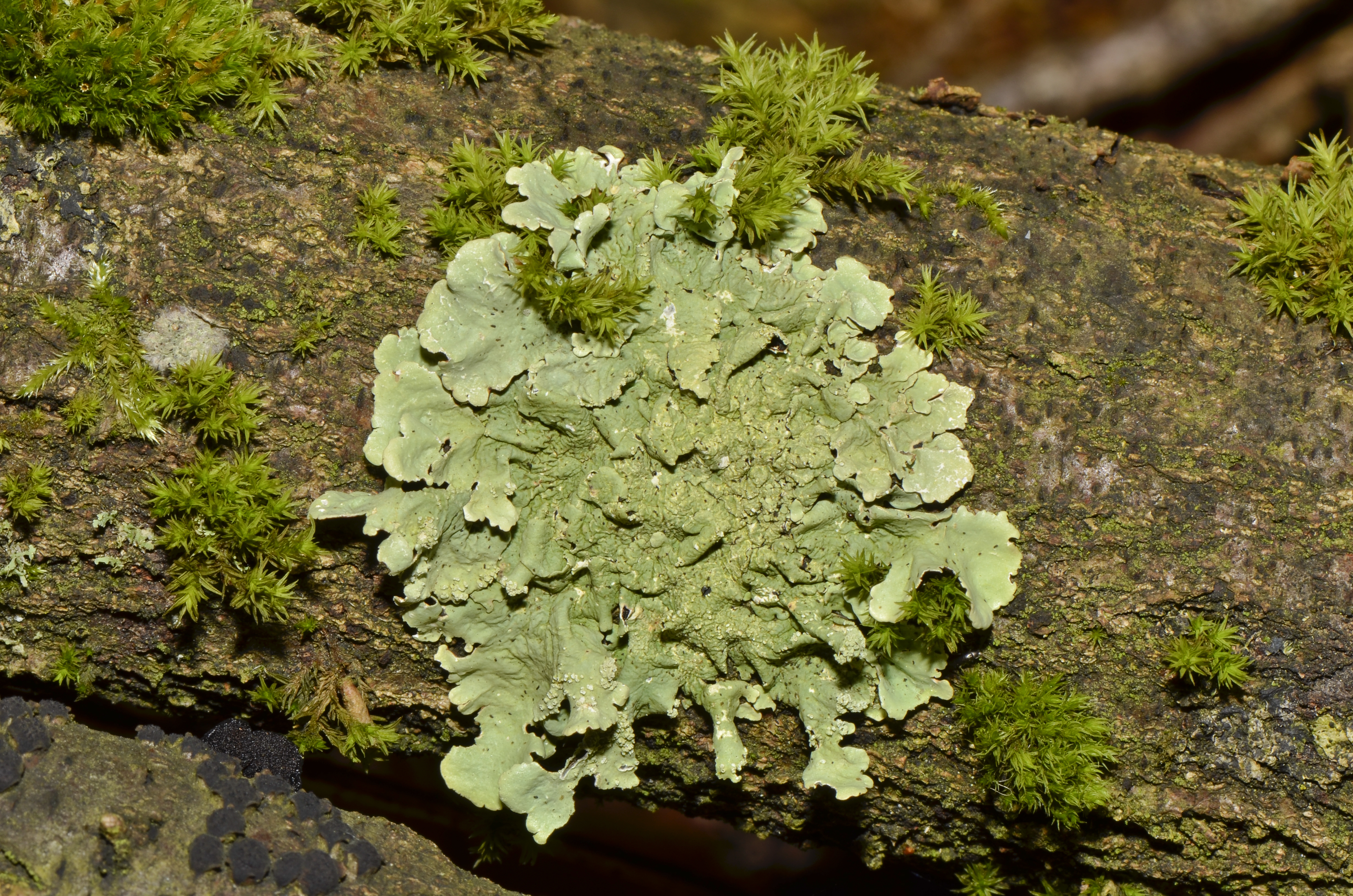
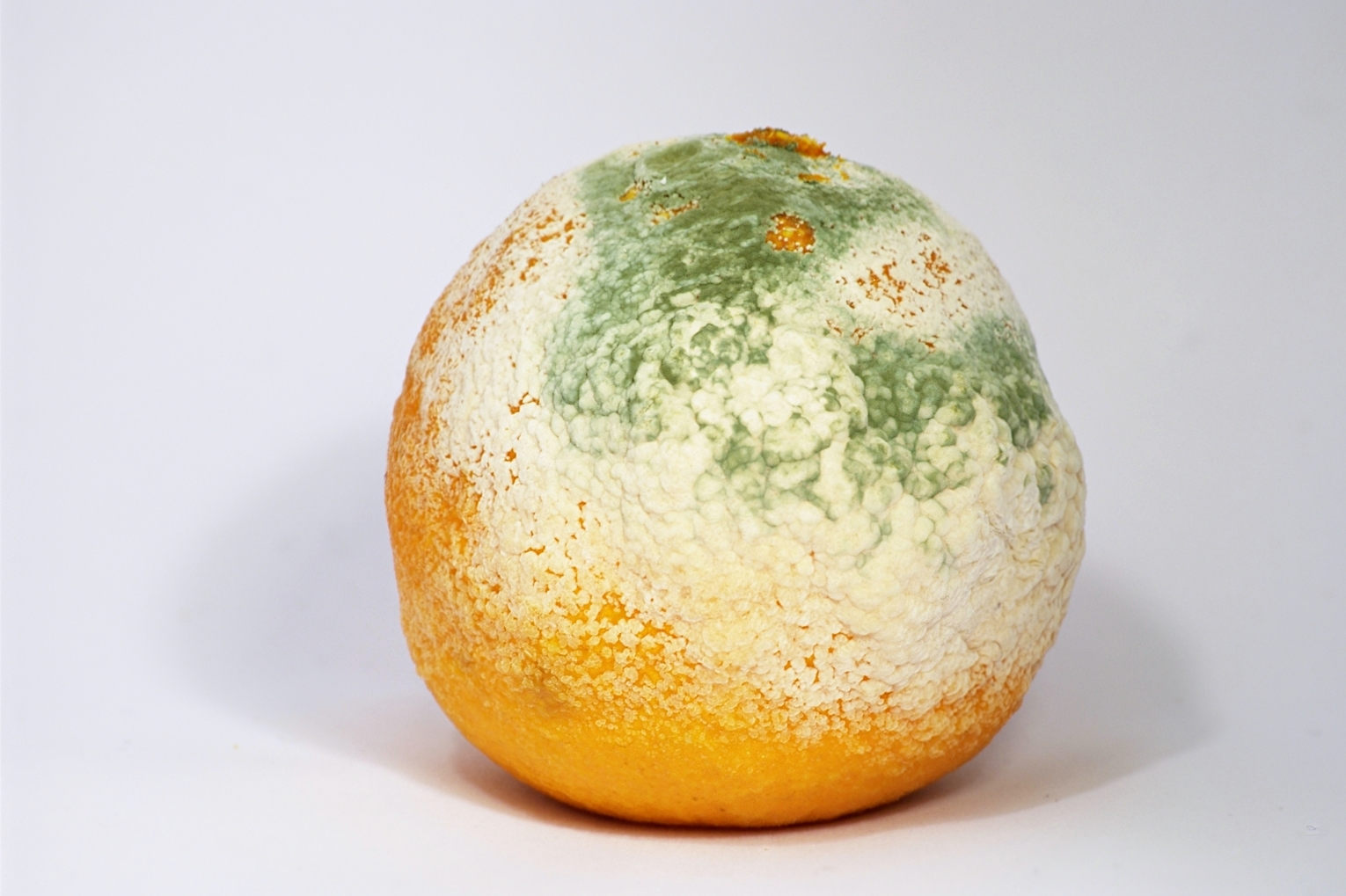
A bay bolete mushroom among Cladonia lichens, Dasyscyphella nivea mold, common greenshield lichen, Penicillium mold on a clementine

This glossary of mycology is a list of definitions of terms and concepts relevant to mycology, the study of fungi. Terms in common with other fields, if repeated here, generally focus on their mycology-specific meaning. Related terms can be found in glossary of biology and glossary of botany, among others. List of Latin and Greek words commonly used in systematic names and Botanical Latin may also be relevant, although some prefixes and suffixes very common in mycology are repeated here for clarity.

== A ==
a-

Prefix meaning "without" or "not".
aboospore
An asexually-produced (parthenogenetic) oospore.
abrupt
Terminating suddenly; appearing to be cut off transversely; truncate. For example, the stipe of some Hohenbuehelia has this characteristic.
abscission
Separation, such as a spore detaching from a sporogenous cell. From Latin abscissio, breaking off.
abstriction
A method of spore formation in fungi characterized by abjunction and then abscission. Spores are produced in a sporogenous filament. In abjunction, they are then separated by transverse walls or septa, with the result spores are grouped in short chains. In abscission, successive portions are cut off and released.
acidophilous

Organisms that can grow in high-acidity environments; in mycology, lichens that can grow in peaty soil or on acidic tree bark.
acropetal
A chain of conidia where new spores are formed at the apex, with the oldest at the base. Compare with basipetal.
acropleurogenous

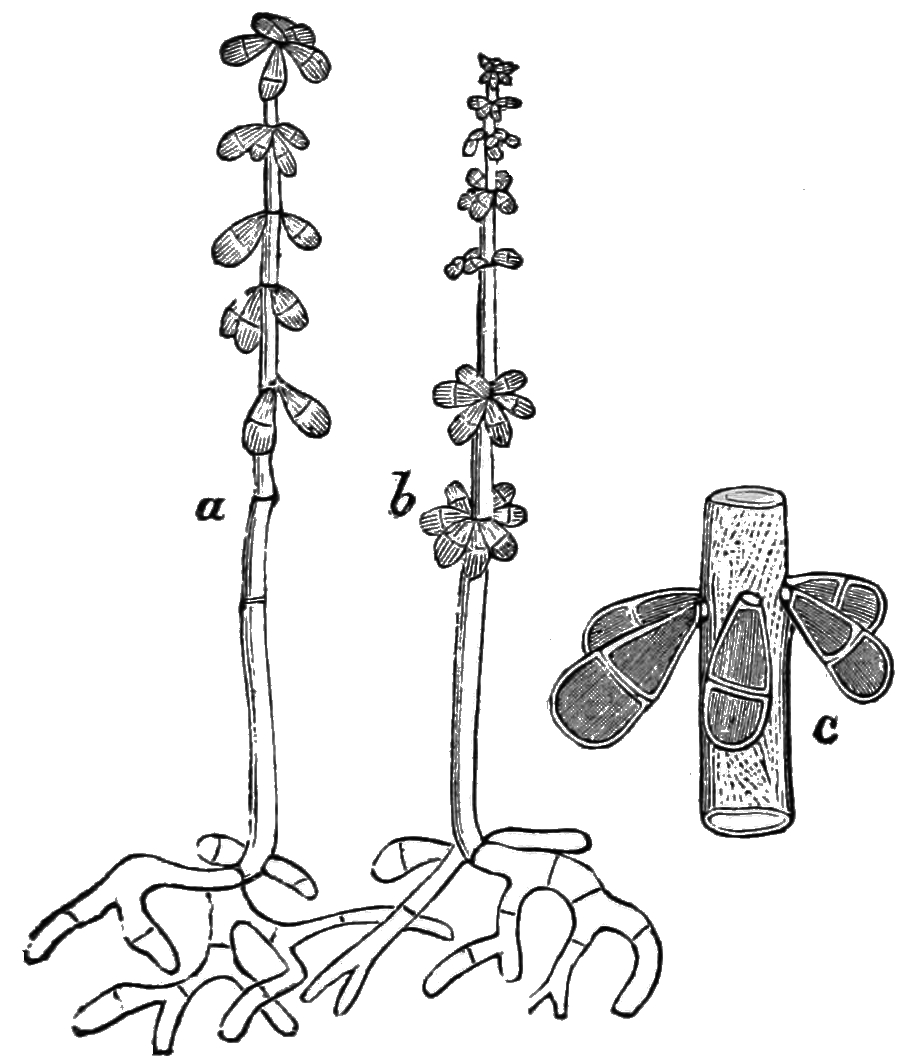
The acropleurogenous Trichothecium roseum, with conidia on sides and at apex

Formed at the apex and along the sides; e.g. conidia of Trichothecium.
adiaspore
Conidium of Emmonsia parva. A large spore that increases notably in size, but does not divide. Upon being inhalted in the lungs of humans and animals, can cause adiaspiromycosis disease. From Gr. a-, without, dia, separating.
adnate

Adhering; attached to the stipe throughout its width, esp. of lamellae or tubes. Compare with free.
aero-aquatic fungi
Aquatic fungi that grow in water, but spread their spores via air.
aethalium

The relatively large fruiting body of many slime molds (Myxomycetes). From Gr. aíthalos, soot.
agaric

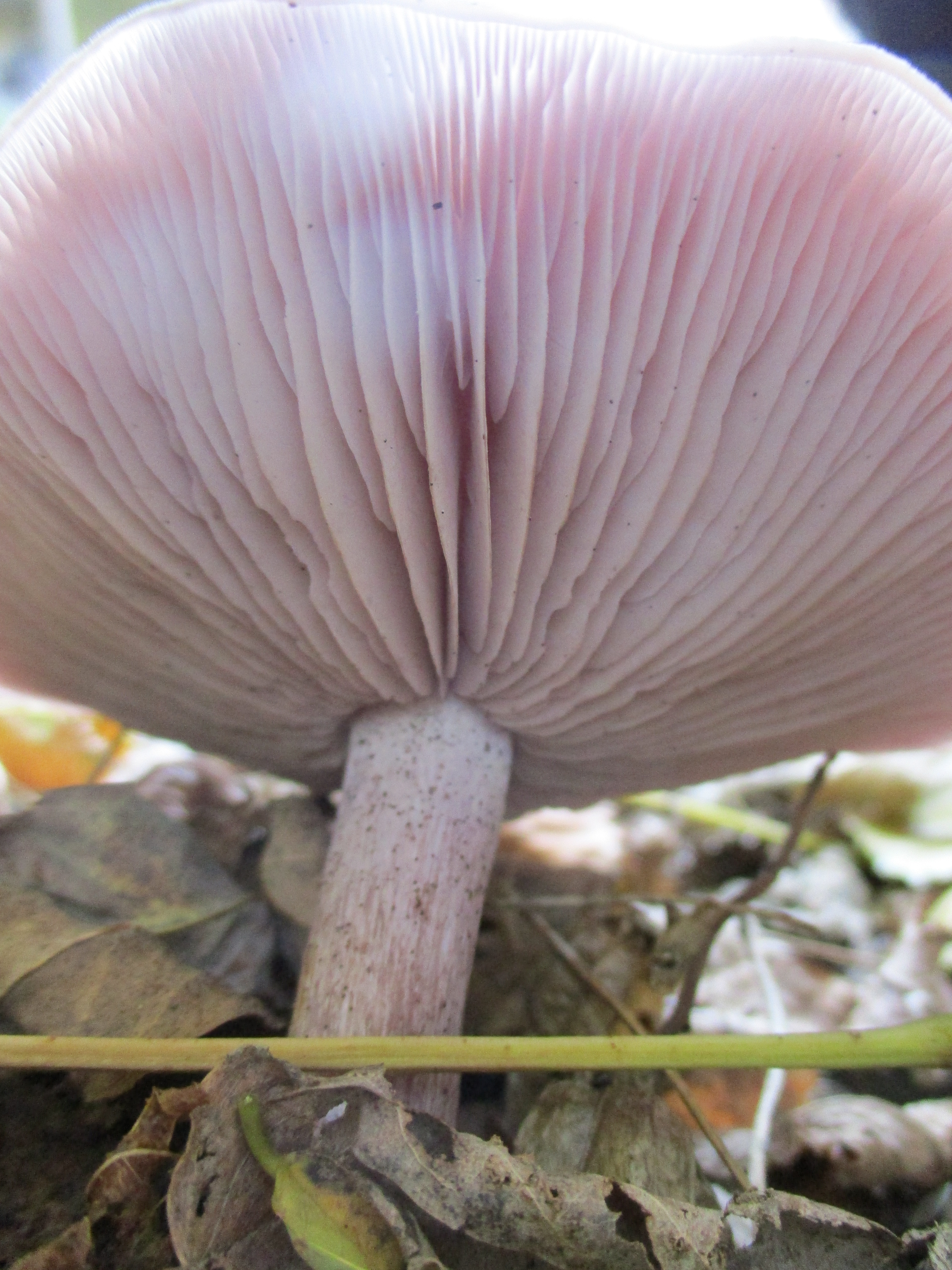
An agaric, with gills on the underside of the pileus

A member of the order Agaricales; a mushroom or toadstool. Contains many iconic and highly studied fungi. Agarics have a macroscopic (human-visible) fleshy basidioma with a clearly differentiated stipe (stalk), pileus (cap), and lamellae (gills) on the underside of the pileus.
algicolous
Living on algae.
amerospore
A single-celled, non-septate cell in mitosporic fungi; compare with dictyospore and phragmospore.
anamorph

An asexual state of a fungus, characterized by the presence of conidia and the absence of sexual spores.
anastomosis
Fusion between branches of hyphae to make a network.
annellidic

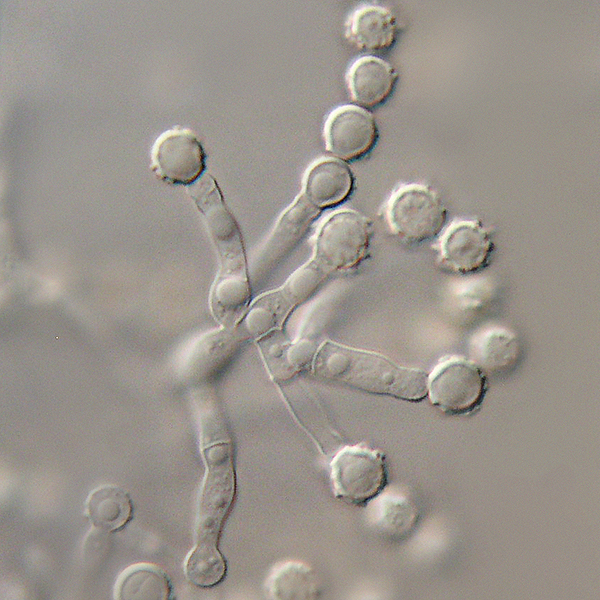
Magnified view of Scopulariopsis brevicaulis, its annellides, and the ring-shaped annellations emanating from them

A type of blastic conidiogenesis. The conidiogenous cell (also called an annellide) produces a basipetal sequence of conidia called annelloconidia or annellospores. The distal end is marked by ring-shaped bands called annellations. Examples include many aquatic Hyphomycetes, Venturia inaequalis, and Microascus brevicaulis.
annular
1. Ring-like; an arrangement in the style of a ring.
2. Resembling an annulus.
annulus

A ring-like covering around the stipe after expansion of the pileus.
antheridium

The male sexual organ (gametangium) of fungi. Produces either antherozoids (flagellate gametes or sperm) or gametic nuclei.
apical

At the tip or end (apex).
apiculus
A short projection at the end of a spore.
aplanospore
A non-motile asexual spore in some Zygomycetes, contained in globose sporangia or cylindrical merosporangia. From Gr. planos, roaming.
apodial

Having no stem or pedicel, such as a pileus lacking a stipe and directly attached to the substrate. Found in sporangia of Perichanea for example. From Gr. podos, foot.
apothecium

A type of fruiting body that, at maturity, opens to expose the hymenium of asci; commonly assumes shape of a cup or saucer. The stipe is sometimes lichenized. From Gr. apotheke, storehouse.
apophysis
A swelling or a swollen filament. Associated with the swollen end of a sporangiophore in Mucorales or the protuberance found beneath the sporocarp of some fungi, especially Protosteliales.
appressed

Flattened, or closely applied; e.g. of scales or fibers.
appressorium

A swelling at the end of a germ tube or other hypha that adheres to the surface of its host and penetrates it with infection hyphae. Characteristic of plant pathogenic fungi such as Phytophthora and Colletotrichum, as well as parasites of animals such as Entomophthora.
aquatic fungi

Fungi that live in water. Sometimes subdivided into freshwater-living fungi and marine fungi for saltwater-living fungi. Freshwater fungi include: Many zoosporic fungi of Chytridiomycota, Chytridiales, and Saprolegniales; some saxicolous lichens of Lichinaceae that live on submerged rocks; aquatic hyphomycetes or Ingoldian fungi, a group of mitosporic fungi that live in freshwater with branched or sigmoidial spores, often growing on dead leaves in streams; smuts of aquatic plants; and certain yeasts.
archicarp
The cell, hypha, or coil of Ascomycetes that later becomes the ascoma, or part of it.
ardella
A small spot-like apothecium, as in the lichen Arthonia. From Latin ardere, to sprinkle.
areola

A delimited space on a surface, separated from others by fissures or cracks.
arthric

A method of thallic conidiogenesis that converts a hyphal element into a conindium (also called an arthrospore), fragmenting the hypha. Common in many basidiomycetes. Compare with holothallic. From Gr. arthron, joint.
asc-

A prefix meaning sac, bladder, or ascus. From Gr. askós, vessel, bag, or wineskin.
ascoma

The asci-bearing fruiting body of Ascomycetes.
Ascomycota

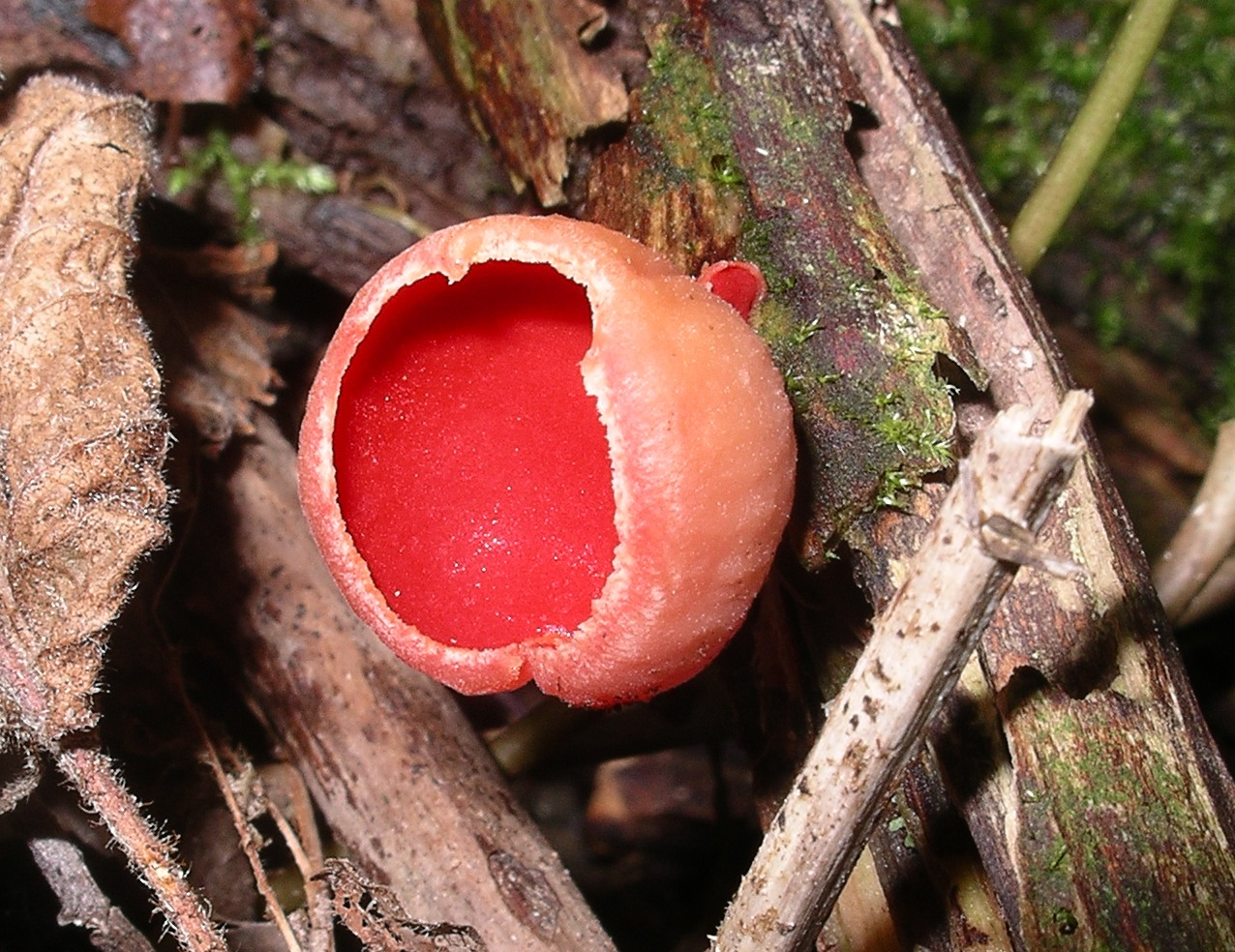
A scarlet elf cup, one of the ascomycetes

A phylum of fungi characterized by the presence of an ascus, a sac-like structure where ascospores are produced. The largest group of fungi. Includes cup fungi or Discomycetes; most dermatophytes; the mycobiont part of most lichens; powdery mildews; and fungi that produce truffles.
ascospore
Spores formed in the developing ascus, generally as a result of karyogamy (nuclear fusion) followed by meiosis. Commonly, four haploid daughter nuclei divide to make eight haploid nuclei, around which eight ascospores are created by depositing wall material around them, a process sometimes called free cell formation.
ascus

The reproductive cell of ascomycetes; where ascospores form and are contained. While sometimes traditionally restricted to only sexual reproduction, purely asexual mitosporic fungi have since been classified as having asci as well (List of mitosporic Ascomycota).
assimilative

Hyphae related to growth, nutrition, and asexual reproduction as opposed to sexual reproduction; the soma.
autochthonous
1. Indigenous, especially to a type of soil or earth.
2. Continuously active, as opposed to organisms that only become active when a suitable substrate becomes available such as yeasts (zymogenous).
azygospore
A spore close in form to a zygospore, but developed asexually (parthogenesis). Found in many species of Mucorales and some species of Entomophthorales, such as Entomophthora muscae. The structure that contains it is called an azygosporangium.

== B ==
ballistospore
A forcibly discharged basidiospore; the most typical kind. Compare with statismospore. From Latin ballista.
basidioma

A typical basidioma, showing fruiting body, hymenium, and basidia

A basidium-producing organ; the fruiting body of Basidiomycota.
Basidiomycota

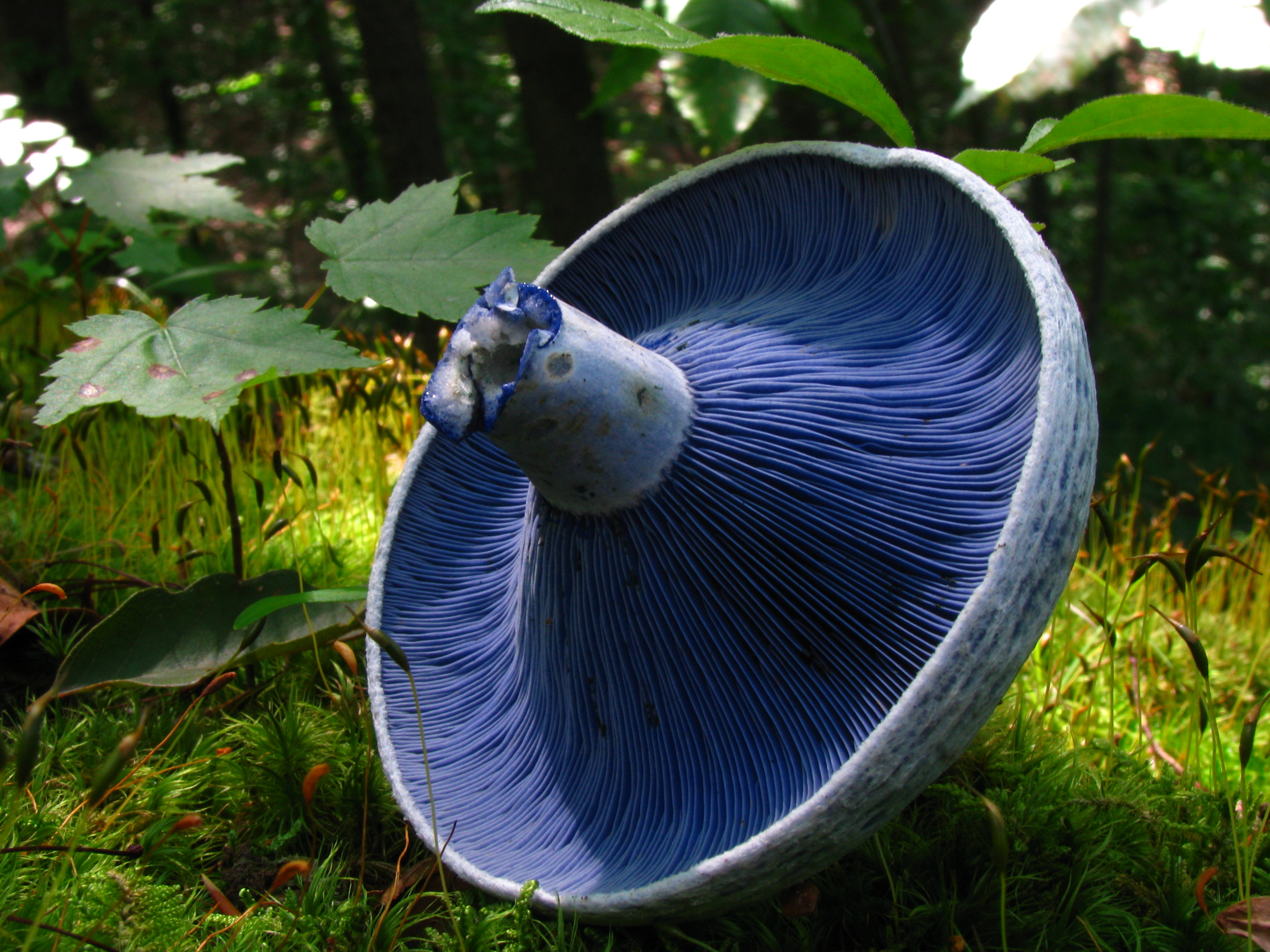
A Lactarius indigo, a milk-cap mushroom and basidiomycete

A phylum of fungi. Generally defined by sexual reproduction via basidiospores formed from a basidium, although a few purely anamorphic basidiomycetes exist. Typically mycelial, although some are yeasts and some are dimorphic. Basidiomycetes include earth balls; earthstars; false truffles; jelly fungi; many mushrooms; polypores; puffballs; most rusts; most smuts; and stinkhorns.
basidiospore
A propagative sexual spore produced on a basidium, typically following karyogamy and meiosis, typically containing one or two haploid nuclei.
basidium

A cell or organ where basidiospores are produced, generally four. Basidia are characteristic of basidiomycetes. From Greek basis, base.
basipetal
A chain of conidia in which new spores are formed at the base and the oldest are at the apex. Compare with acropetal.
blastic
One of the two basic forms of conidiogenesis, with thallic conidiogenesis. Characterized by the enlargement of the conidia initial before it is delimited by a septum. In holoblastic, both inner and outer walls of the blastic conidiogenous cell contribute to the formation of the conidium; in enteroblastic, only the inner walls enlarge and contribute. Monoblastic is from a single conidiogenous locus; polyblastic is when a conindiogenous cell has multiple conidiogenous loci.
blastospore
An asexual spore that forms by budding. One of the conidia types that can be produced in blastic conidiogenesis. Examples include yeasts such as Candida glabrata and Kloeckera, and the plant pathogenic Monilinia and Cladosporium mold.
bolete
An iconic variety of mushroom characterized by fleshy fruit bodies and a poroid hymenophore (marked by pores rather than the gill-marked cap of agarics). They are often edible. Boletes are members of the order Boletales.
budding

A type of asexual cellular multiplication. A small outgrowth or bud from a parent cell enlarges and eventually separates from the parent cell. Typical in yeasts and many molds. Sometimes divided by how many buds are made, with monopolar, bipolar, and multipolar budding for one/two/many respectively.
bulbil
A compact multicellular propagule, with its thin-walled, undifferentiated cells produced in acropetal succession from the hyphae. Superficially resembles plant tissue at maturity (pseudoparenchymatous) such as raspberries, hence the resemblance to bulbils in botany. Found in certain basidiomycetes; characteristic of aero-aquatic fungi such as Bulbillomyces farinosus, where they grow on leaves or tree branches previously submerged in water.

== C ==
capitulum

The stalked, globose, apical apothecium of lichens of the order Caliciales.
carp-

Combining forms meaning "fruit". From Gr. karpós, fruit.
capsule

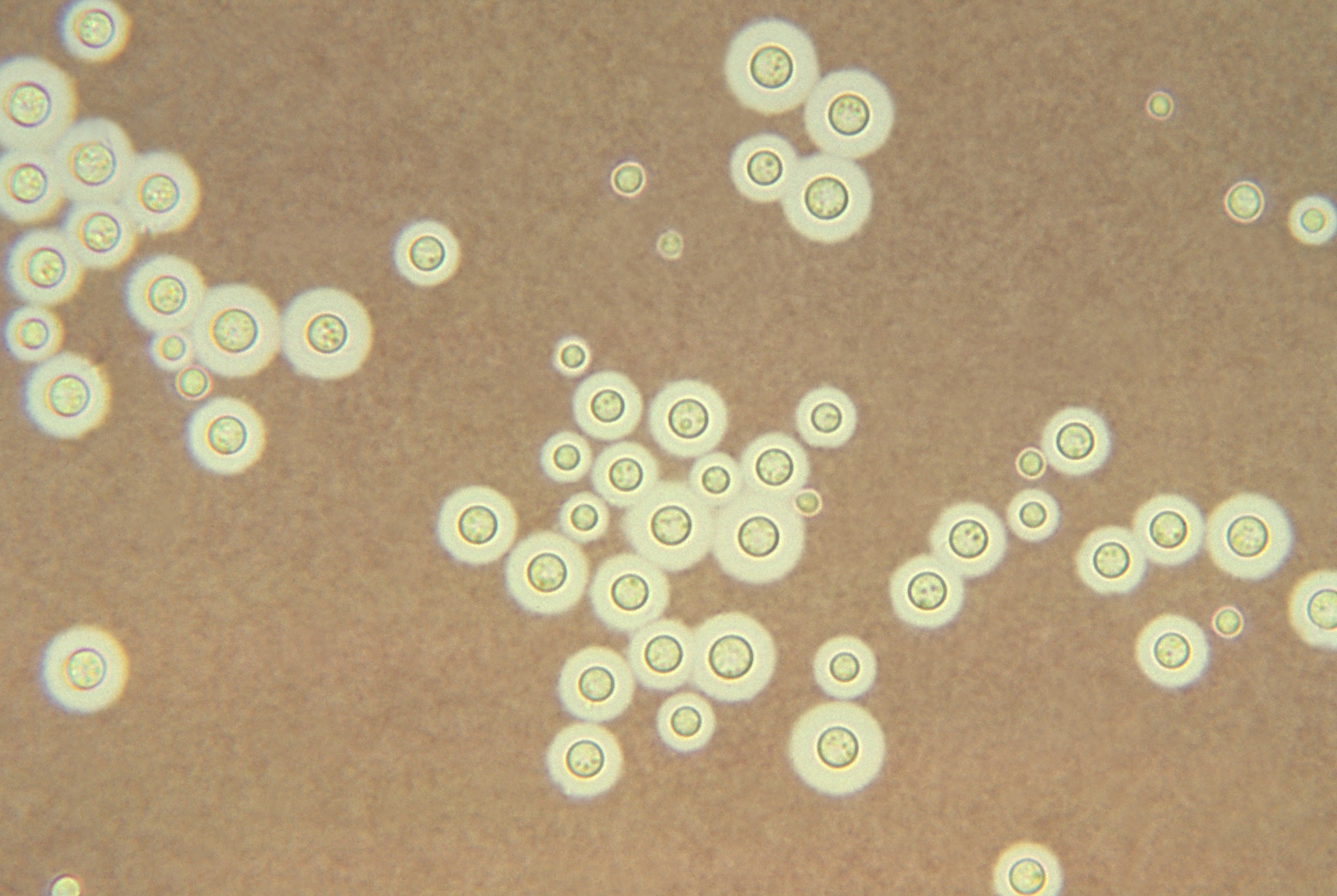
Magnification of the yeast Cryptococcus neoformans; the capsules are the circular outer borders of the yeast cells.

A clear, gelatinous covering or sheath around the cell wall of certain yeasts, e.g. Cryptococcus, and some ascospores such as those of Sordaria fimicola.
catenate

Arranged in chains or end-to-end series. Catenulate is the diminutive form for small chains. From Latin catena, a chain.
chitin
A nitrogen-containing polysaccharide found in many fungal cell walls, generally as part of a chitin-glucan complex. From Gr. chiton, tunic.
Chitomycetes
An obsolete division of fungi, meaning possessing mycelium; subsumed by Eumycota in later literature.
chitosome
A small spheroidal organelle in many fungi that synthesizes chitin using chitin synthase zymogen, to use for cell wall synthesis.
chlamydospore

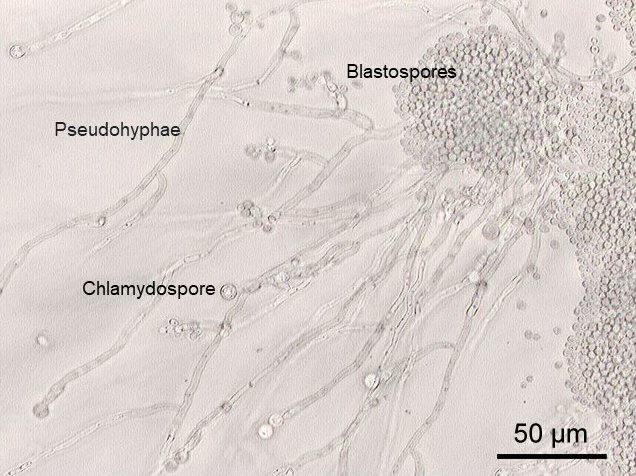
A 200x magnification of Candida albicans, including a chlamydospore

An asexual thick-walled spore developed from hyphae, generally for perennation rather than dissemination. From Gr. chlamys, cloak, -ydos, spore.
Chytridiomycota

A phylum of fungi. Informally known as chytrids. Characterized by chitinous cell walls and reproduction via zoospores, which are usually uniflagellate in the posterior although rarely polyflagellate. Many are saprobes that live in freshwater (see aquatic fungi) or the soil.
cirrus

A curl-like tuft; usually refers to a tendril-like mass of forced-out spores.
clamp connection

Clamp connection formation between two nuclei (one in green, the other orange)

A hyphal outgrowth that makes a connection during cell division between the resulting two cells by fusion. Generally associated with mycelium of Basidiomycetes.
clavate
Narrowing at the base and then thickening; club-shaped.
cleistothecium

A closed fruit body that has no pre-defined opening; opens by rupture. Seen, e.g., in ascoma of Thielavia or in Erysiphales.
Coelomycetes
An artificial taxon for mitosporic fungi with pycnidial and acervular states, i.e. they form their spores in an internal cavity. From Gtk. koilos, hollow.
coeno-
Prefix meaning "multinucleate". From Gr. koinós, shared or in common.
coenocytic
Hyphae that lack septa and are multi-nucleate; seen in Zygomycota and Oomycota. From Gr. kytos, cell. Distinct from a synctium, a multinucleate structure resulting from fusion of protoplasts.
colony
A massed group of hyphae and spores of a single species, especially if all are grown from a single spore (e.g. in a lab).
columella

A sterile central axis within a fruiting body (sporocarp) or sporangium.
complicate
Bent or folded on itself. From Latin plicare, to fold.
conidiogenesis
The process of producing conidia. Subdivided into blastic and thallic conidiogenesis.
conidiogenous
Producing conidia. Generally used as "conidiogenous cell", fertile cells that produce conidia; or "conidiogenous locus", for the particular point on a hypha or a cell where conidia are generated.
conidioma

Any multi-hyphal, conidia-bearing structure. An umbrella term that includes various traditional conidia-bearing structures such as a synnema, a sporodochium, an acervulus, or a pycnidium.
conidiophore

A specialized hypha bearing or consisting of conidiogenous cells upon which conidia develop.
conidium

A thin-walled, asexual spore borne on specialized hypha known as conidiophores. From Gr. konidion, diminutive of konis (dust).
coprophilous
Growing or living on animal dung.
cortex

A thick outer-covering or rind, generally of a fruiting body. From Latin cortice, bark.
corticolous
Living on tree bark.
cortina

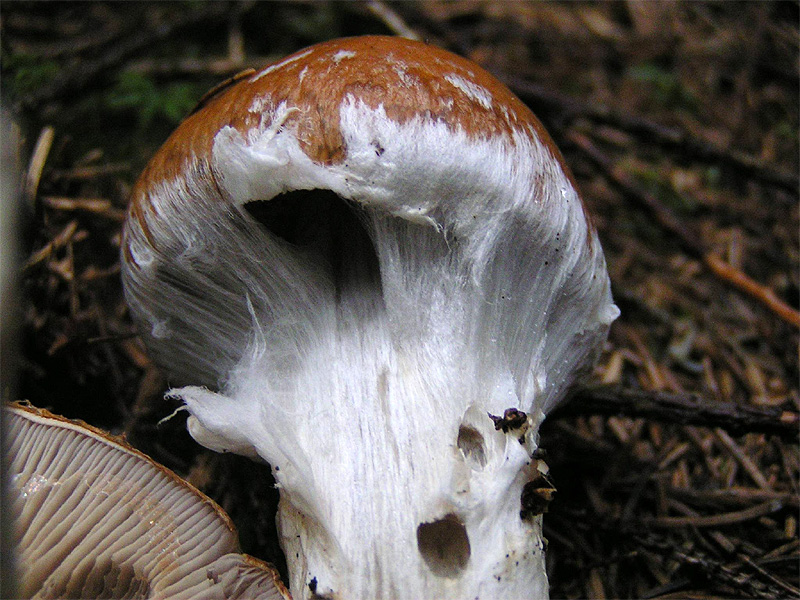
A cobweb-like cortina of Cortinarius claricolor

Of agarics, the remnants of the partial veil, frequently web-like, that covers mature gills. Thin and evanescent; eventually breaks up and disappears.
crozier

The hook of an ascogenous hypha before development of the ascus.
cruciate
In the form of a cross.
crustose

Crust-like or having a hard surface layer, e.g. in a sporocarp; in lichens, a thallus firmly fixed to the substratum by the whole of their lower surface, generally lacking a distinct lower cortex.
cyphella

A break in the lower cortex of a lichen thallus which appears as a cup-like structure or marking. Characteristic of Sticta. From Gr. kyphella, the hollow of an ear.
cyst
1. A sac or cavity.
2. A zoospore protected by a resistant cell wall; seen in "lower fungi" such as aquatic chytrids and Amoebidiales.
cystidium

A large, sterile cell on the surface of a basidioma, particularly the hymenium from which it frequently projects.

== D ==
dentate
Toothed, e.g. of gills.
denticle
A small, tooth-like projection, especially one on which spores are borne.
dermatophyte
A parasitic fungus that focuses on tissue with keratin (skin, hair, nails) of humans and animals. Associated with the genera Epidermophyton, Microsporum, and Trichophyton.
dermatophytosis

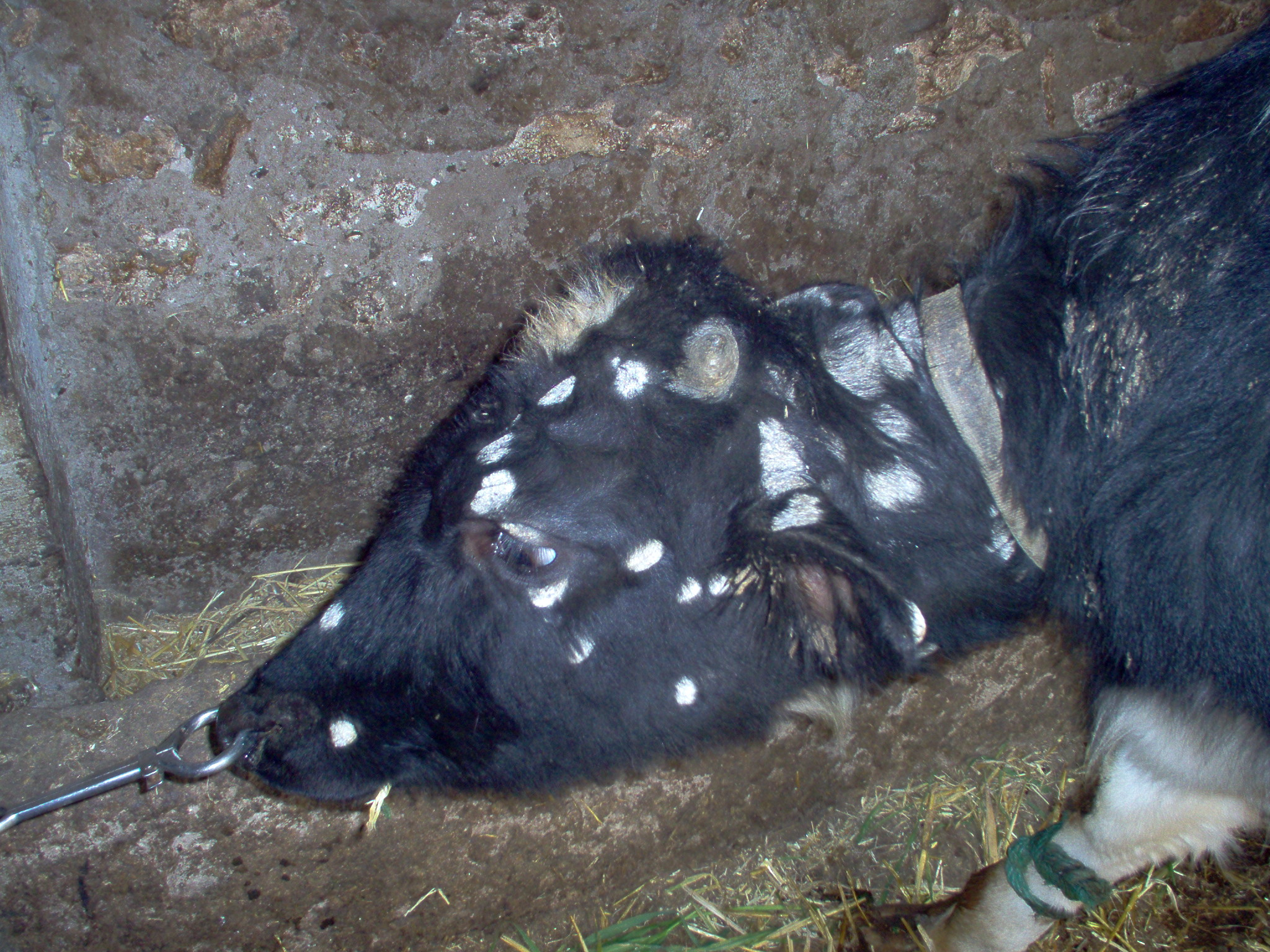
A cow's head afflicted by dermatophytosis

The skin condition caused by a dermatophyte infection.
dichotomous
Forking into roughly equal pairs, often repeatedly, e.g. in hyphal branching. Compare with monopodial.
dictyospore

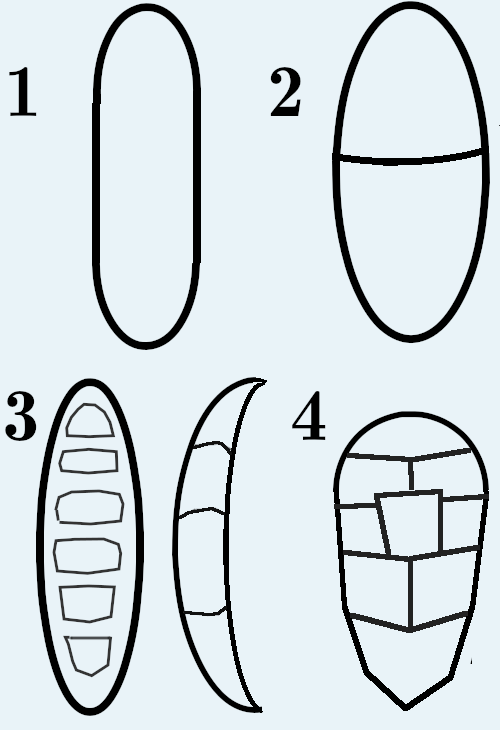
(1) An amerospore with no intersecting septa; (2) a didyomospore with a single intersecting septa; (3) two sample phragmospore patterns with multiple septa subdividing the spore; (4) a dictyospore with a brick wall-like muriform pattern of intersecting septa

Divided by intersecting septa in more than one plane, both transverse and longitudinal; a muriform spore. Found in Alternaria alternata as an example.
didymospore
A two-celled spore divided by a single septum. Usually applied to mitosporic fungi. Compare with amerospore and phragmospore.
Dikarya
A subkingdom of Fungi that includes Ascomycota and Basidiomycota, or "higher fungi."
dikaryotic

A single cell (dikaryon) having two genetically distinct haploid nuclei.
dimorphic

Having two forms, e.g. both yeast and mycelial forms. Examples include Histoplasma and Sporothrix.
diplanetism
A life cycle with two types of zoospores (dimorphic), primary and secondary.
Discomycetes

A class of saucer-shaped and cup-shaped Ascomycetes in which the hymenium is exposed at maturity; one in which the fruit body is an apothecium (discocarp). Prominent members include Pezizales, Helotiales, Ostropales, and Lecanorales.
disjunctor
An evanescent connective, consisting of either a cell or cell wall material. It develops through the pores of septal lamellae of adjoining conidia in a chain, before later fragmenting and releasing the conidia.
dolipore septum

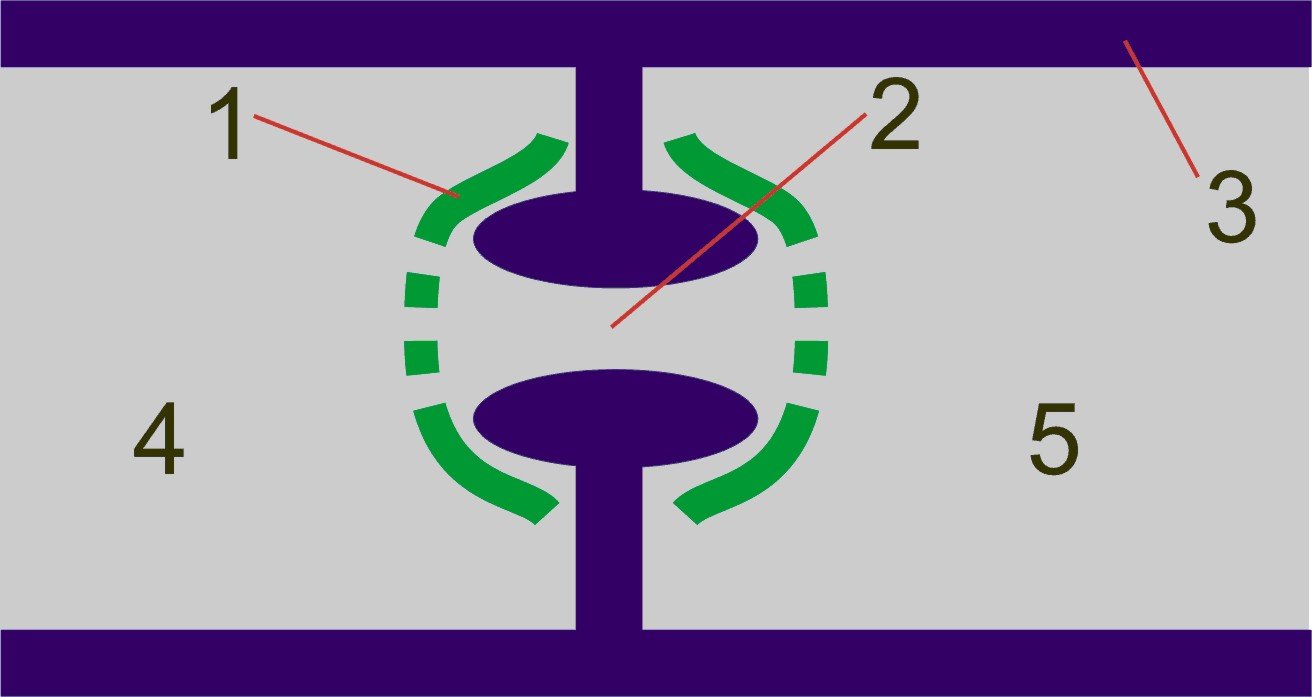
In hyphae of basidiomycete fungi, parenthesomes (1) "cap" a dolipore septum; (2) the cell wall; (3) swells around the septal pore to form a barrel-shaped ring. Perforations in the parenthesome allow cytoplasm to flow between (4) and (5).

A septum found in Basidiomycetes that flares out in the middle to form a channel.

== E ==
echinate
Having sharply pointed spines, e.g. of spores. Its diminutive is echinulate, for delicate spines. Sometimes synonymous with spinose. From Gr. echinos, hedgehog.
effete
Past the bearing period; overmature, e.g. a fruiting body that has emptied its spores.
effuse
Expanded; stretched out flat, e.g. a film-like growth. From Latin fundere, to pour.
elf cups
1.

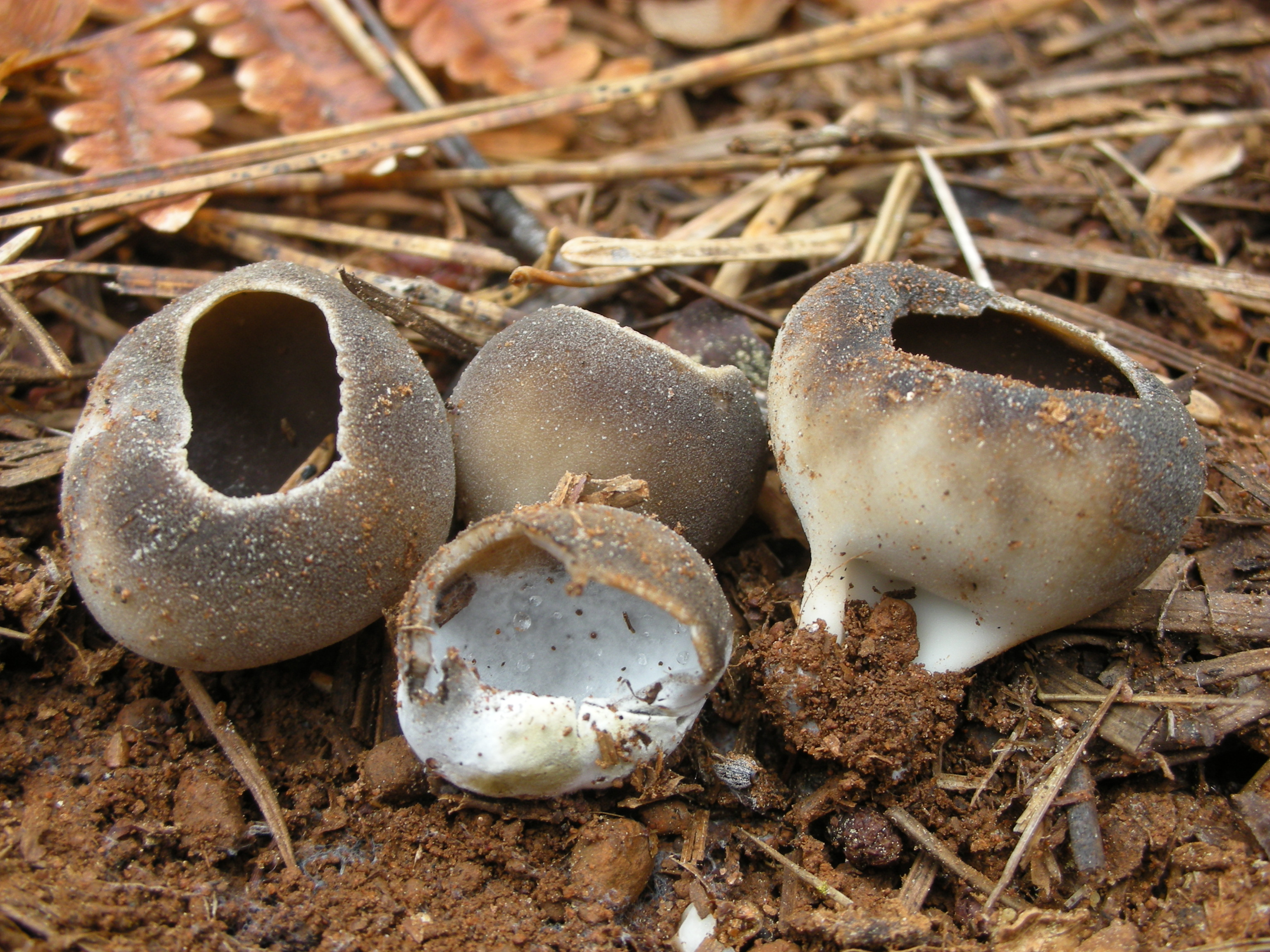
Elf cups of Helvella leucomelaena

Ascomata of Pezizales.
2. Scarlet elf cup: An ascoma of Sarcoscypha coccinea.
3. Green elf cup: Ascomata of Helotiales, such as Chlorociboria.
endo-
Prefix meaning "inner" or "inside", from Gr. éndon.
endobiotic
Growing within another living organism.
endophyte
An organism that lives within a plant; in mycology, specifically fungi that live within plants but do not show external signs or damage to the plants. This is usually endomycorrhizial fungi in root systems and asymptomatic fungi in aerial plant parts
endospore
1. An endogenous spore, e.g. a sporgangiospore, often resembling an ascospore.
2. The innermost wall of a spore wall (endosporium).
endothrix
Living within hair. Generally associated with parasitic dermatophyte infections.
epibiotic
Growing on the outer surface of another organism.
epicortex
A thin layer on top of the cortex; e.g. a sugar-like layer over some Parmeliaceae lichens or a layer on the apothecium of some Pezizales
erect
Upright; not curved.
ergot
1.

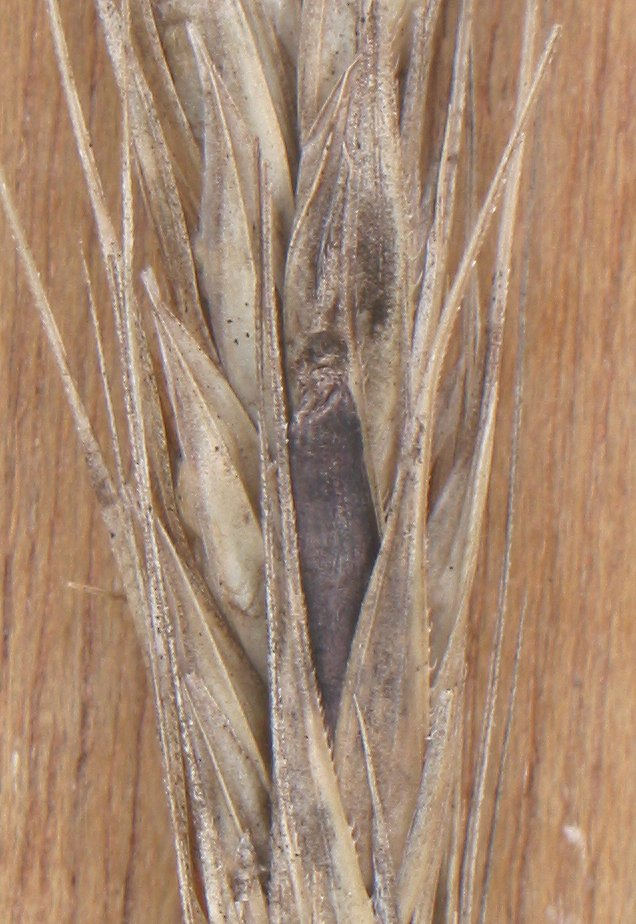
Ergot-infested rye of the fungus Claviceps purpurea

A disease of cereals and grasses caused by the fungus Claviceps.
2. The ergot fungus itself, or its sclerotia.
erumpent
Breaking through the surface of the substratum.
ethnomycology
The study of the use of fungi by human cultures.
evanescent
Having a short existence; soon disappearing, e.g. of a veil, an annulus, etc. From Latin evanscere, to disappear.
eucarpic

Thalli where reproductive structures only develop on limited portions during fructication. The rest of the thallus remains in its original assimilative function. Compare holocarpic. If they have one sporangium, they are monocentric; if they have several sporgangia, they are polycentric. The vast majority of fungi are eucarpic.
Eumycota
Fungi. From Greek for "true fungi". Generally used to distinguish fungi from related Pseudofungi traditionally also studied in mycology, as well as recently separated sister organisms such as Rozellida. The four traditional phyla of (true) fungi are Ascomycota, Basidiomycota, Chytridiomycota, and Zygomycota; Glomeromycota and Microsporidia have split off more recently.
exobasidial
1. With exposed basidia.
2. Separated by a wall from the basidium.
exochthonus

Invasive, not indigenous; especially for organisms not adapted to a particular soil.

== F ==
fairy ring

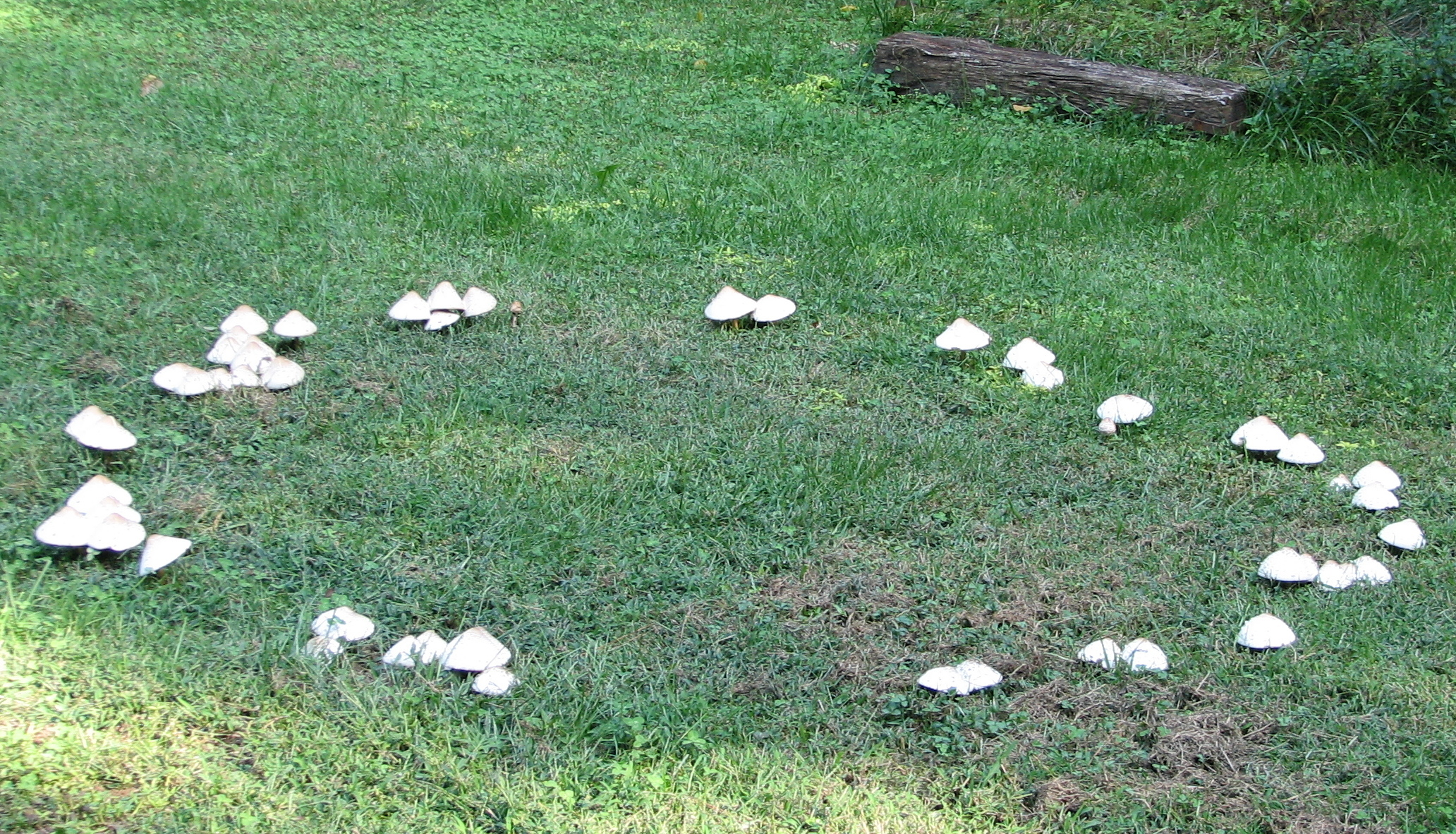
A fairy ring

Mushrooms or puffballs forming in a circle, started from a central mycelium in the soil. Fairy rings expand with time if undisturbed, and are generally associated with basidiomycetes.
falcate

Curved, like a sickle or scythe. From Latin falx and falcis, sickle.
fermentation

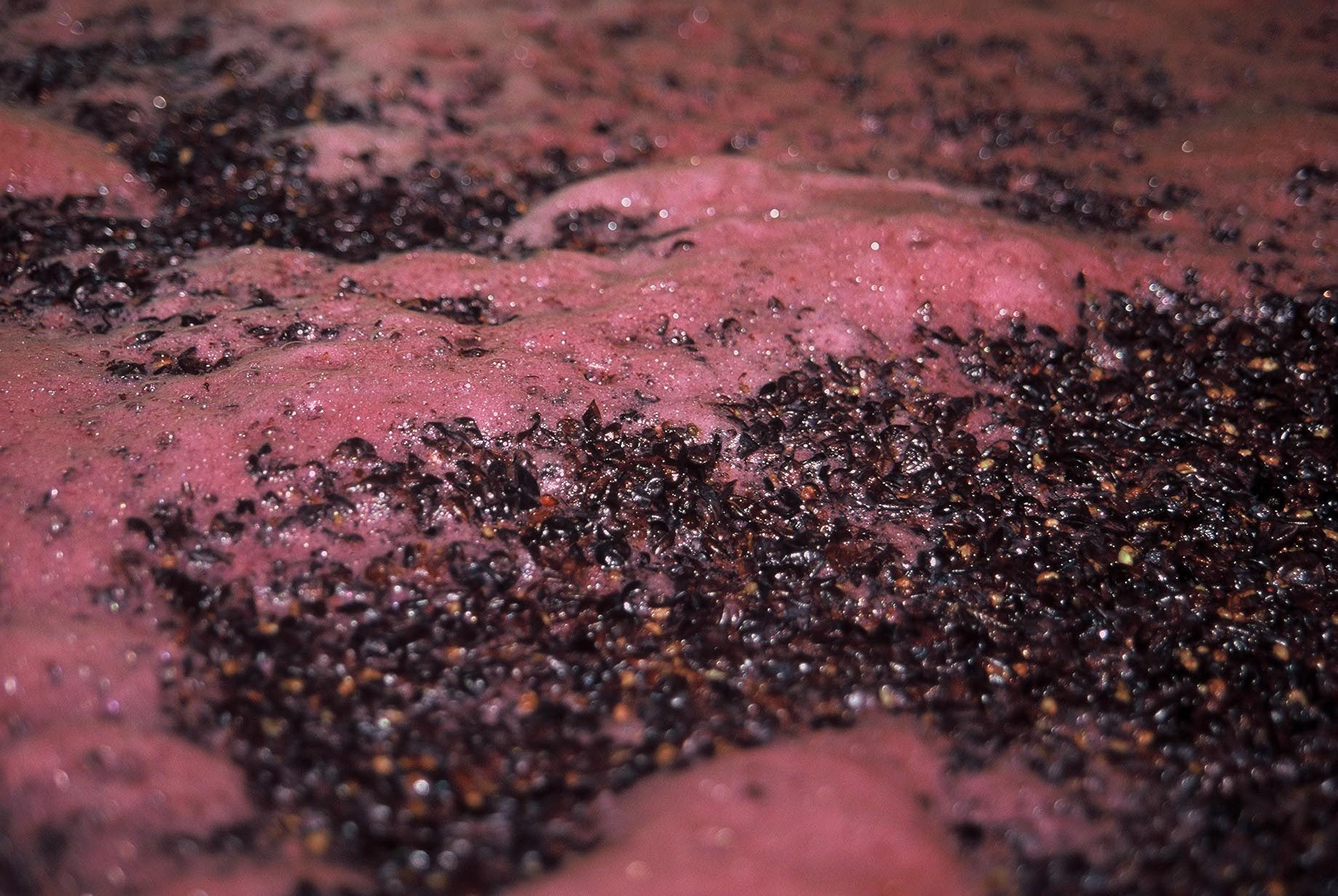
Pinot Noir grapes being fermented by yeasts in winemaking

A chemical change caused by enzymes of living organisms. In mycology, typically yeasts and molds performing anaerobic breakdowns such as changing carbohydrates to carbon dioxide and alcohol. Part of the creation of fermented foods and fermented drinks (most notably alcoholic beverages).
filament
A fine thread. Commonly used for hyphal threads or other simple thread-like fungal structures. From Latin filum, thread.
filamentous

1. Thread-like, or composed of filaments.
2. In lichens, when the photobiont forms in threads surrounded by hyphae of the mycobiont; the fungi forms the outer structure. (e.g. Coenogonium, Cystocoleous, Racodium)
filiform
In the shape of a thread; thin.
fleshy
Soft, not cartilaginous or wood-like. Associated with agarics and boletes.
flexuous

Wavy. From Latin flexus, bend.
flocci
Cotton-like groups or tufts.
floccose
Fluffy or cottony; byssoid. Common among many colonies of fungi. Its diminutive form is flocculose, for a small and delicate floccose element. From Latin floccus, a tuft of wool.
flowers of tan
The aethalium of Fuligo septica. Commonly found in tannin-containing tubs drying hides into leather.
flush
The rapidly growing stage of a mycelium, especially in mushrooms.
foliicolous
Living on leaves, e.g. foliicolous lichen.
foliose
1. Leaf-like in form.
2. Of lichens, foliose lichens, characterised by flattened leaf-like thalli.
foot cell

1. A hyphal cell that supports a sporogenous cell or thallus, specifically the support of the conidiophore in Aspergillus and the macroconidium of Fusarium.
2. The thallus in the aquatic fungi of Blastocladiales.
foxfire

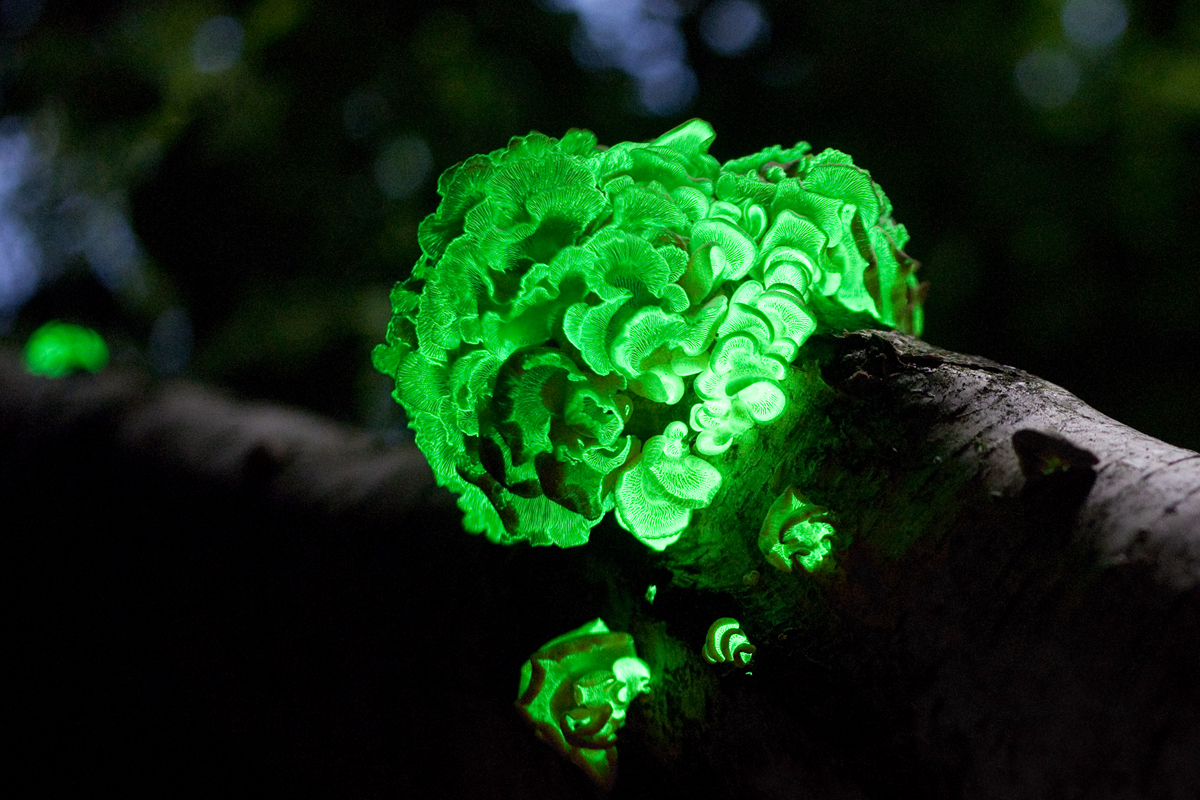
Panelluses stipticus, an example of luminiscient fungi (long exposure photograph)

A phosphorescent light emitted by moist, decaying wood; one of the most famous forms of fungal bioluminescence.
free
Not adhering; not attached to the stipe, esp. of lamellae or tubes. Compare with adnate.
frog cheese
A young puffball.
fructicolous

Living on fruit. From Latin fructus, fruit.
fruticolous

Living on shrubs. From Latin frutex, shrubs.
fungicide
A substance able to kill fungi, especially at low concentration. From Latin caedere, to kill. Generally used for chemical substances rather than heat, light, radiation, etc. which are called sterilization instead.
fungicolous
Living on other fungi.
fungiform
Mushroom-shaped.
fungivorous

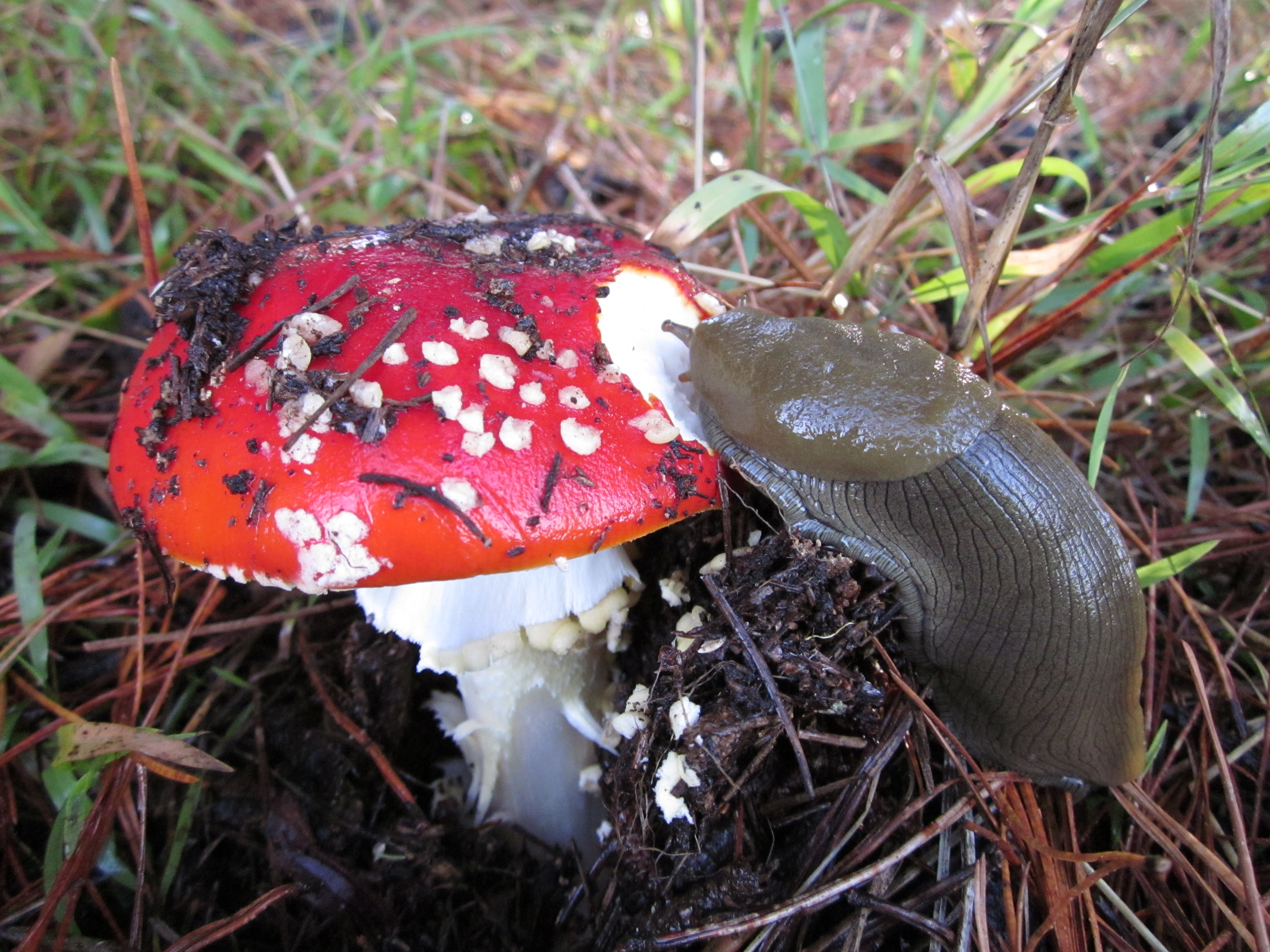
A banana slug feeding on Amanita. Many animals are opportunistic fungivores and eat fungi if available, but only a few near-exclusively target them.

Fungus-eating.
fungoid

Similar to a fungus in texture or morphology.
fungus

A kingdom of organisms in Eukaryota. Fungi are distinguished based on their morphology, nutritional modes, and ecology. Typical traits are that they lack plastids, are osmotrophic (absorb nutrients from their environment), are never phagotrophic, lack an ameboid pseudopodal phase, cell walls are composed of a chitin-glucan complex, mitochondria have flattened cristae and perioxomes are nearly always present, and are mostly non-flagellate; flagella when present lack mastigonemes. From Gr. sphongos, σπόγγος, sponge.
funicular
Cord-like. From Latin funis, rope.
funiculose
(Of hyphae) Aggregated into cord-like strands.
furfuraceous
Covered with bran-like particles; scurfy.
fusiform
Spindle-shaped; narrowing toward the ends. Of spores, stipe, cystidia, etc. From Latin fusus, spindle.
fusoid
Somewhat fusiform.

== G ==
galeate
Hooded; hat-shaped. From Latin galea, helmet.
gamete
A sexual cell; a uninucleate haploid reproductive cell capable of fusing with another. From Gr. gámos, marriage, union.
gemma

1. Another term for chlamydospores, sometimes restricted to specifically spores that broke free from the mycelium to be dispersed, often via water. From Latin gemma, "jewel"
2. A bud or propagule produced by gemmation, as in yeasts.
geniculate
Bent like a knee.
geophilous
Preferring an environment in soil, as in Microsporum cookei or fungi that produce truffles.
germ pore
A hole in a spore wall, frequently apical, through which it germinates. Germ tubes emerge through it. Associated with rusts.
germ sporangium
A sporangium at the end of a germ tube. Originates by germination of an oospore or of a zygosporangium.
germ tube

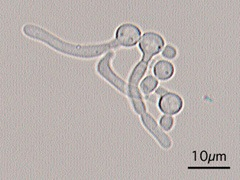
Germ tubes forming in Candida albicans, at 600x magnification

A short hypha that sprouts from the germ pore during germination. If conditions are favorable, will form a full mycelium. In plant pathogenic fungi, forms an appressorium, from which the infective hypha spread and penetrate the tissues of the host.
glabrous
Smooth, not hairy; e.g. of the surface of a pileus or stipe.
gleba

The central, internal portion of the fruiting body of Gasteromycetes and underground Pezizales.
globose
Spherical in shape.
guttate
1. Having tear-like drops. From Latin gutta, drop.
2. Spotted as if stained by drops of liquid, e.g. of a pileus.
guttulate

Spores bearing one or more guttules (oil-like drops) inside, e.g. the ascospores of Podospora comata.
guttule

A small drop or drop-like particle, especially oil-like globules in a spore resembling a nucleus.
Gymnomycota

An obsolete division of fungi, characterized as having a plasmodium. Subsumed by Myxomycota (true slime molds) in later literature.
gymnothecium

An ascoma in which the perithecium is in a loose hyphal network.
gyrate

Curved; folded and wavy, like a brain.

== H ==
hamate
Hooked.
hamathecium
Collective term for hyphae and tissues between asci; interascal tissue.
haustorium

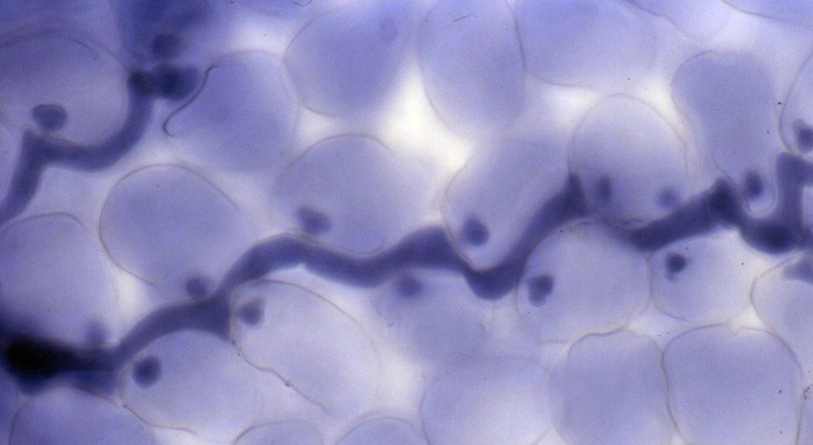
Downy mildew infiltrating cells of the plant Arabidopsis thaliana, at 400x magnification. The stained dark blue spheres are the haustoria.

A hyphal branch for absorption of food. It penetrates the wall of the living host cell. Found in certain parasitic fungal plant pathogens, such as Phytophthora.
heterokaryotic

Having two or more genetically distinct nuclei in a common cytoplasm, making a combined cell.
heterokont

1. A grouping of organisms within Chromista that includes Pseudofungi.
2. Having cilia or flagella of unequal length.
3. A condition where a flagellum possess two rows of tripartite tubular hairs.
heteromerous
In lichens, when the thallus is stratified. The photobiont is distributed in a compact layer, and the hyphal tissue of the fungi are separated into an outer rind and an inner stratum. From Gr. hetero, different, and meros, part.
heterothallism
Fungi that require the interaction of two different thalli for sexual conjugation to occur.
hilum

A scar after a spore is discharged; was previously the point of attachment of a basidiospore to the sterigma. From Latin hilum, mask.
hoary
Covered thickly with silk-like hairs, especially of a pileus or stipe, often grayish or white.
holocarpic
Having all of the thallus converted into the fruiting body at the end of maturation; compare eucarpic. The somatic and reproductive phases do not coexist as a result. Examples include Olpidiaceae and Synchytriaceae.
holomorph
Term describing the whole fungus throughout all its morphs (states, phases). Generally includes a single teleomorph phase and one or more anamorph phases.
holothallic
A method of thallic conidiogenous in which a hyphal element is converted as a whole into a single conidium. All the cell wall layers are involved. Compare with arthric. From Gr. holos, whole.
homoiomerous
In lichens, when the photobiont is are distributed uniformly or at random throughout the thallus. From Gr. homoios, similar.
homokaryotic

Having genetically identical (or near-identical) nuclei, e.g. in a mycelium.
homothallism
The condition where sexual reproduction can occur in a single thallus, without the interaction of two separate thalli.
hydrophilous
Preferring an aquatic habitat. Common among zygomycetes, as zoospores rely on water to move.
hygrophilous
Preferring a moist habitat. Common among fungi.
hygroscopic
1. Becoming soft in wet air, hard in dry; readily absorbing moisture from the atmosphere.
2. (of a sporocarp) Opening and discharging spores in dry air.
hymenium
The spore-bearing fruiting surface of Ascomycetes and Basidiomycetes. An aggregation of asci or basidia in a layer (palisade) mixed with other sterile cells.
hymenophore
The portion of a basidioma or ascoma bearing the hymenium.
hypha

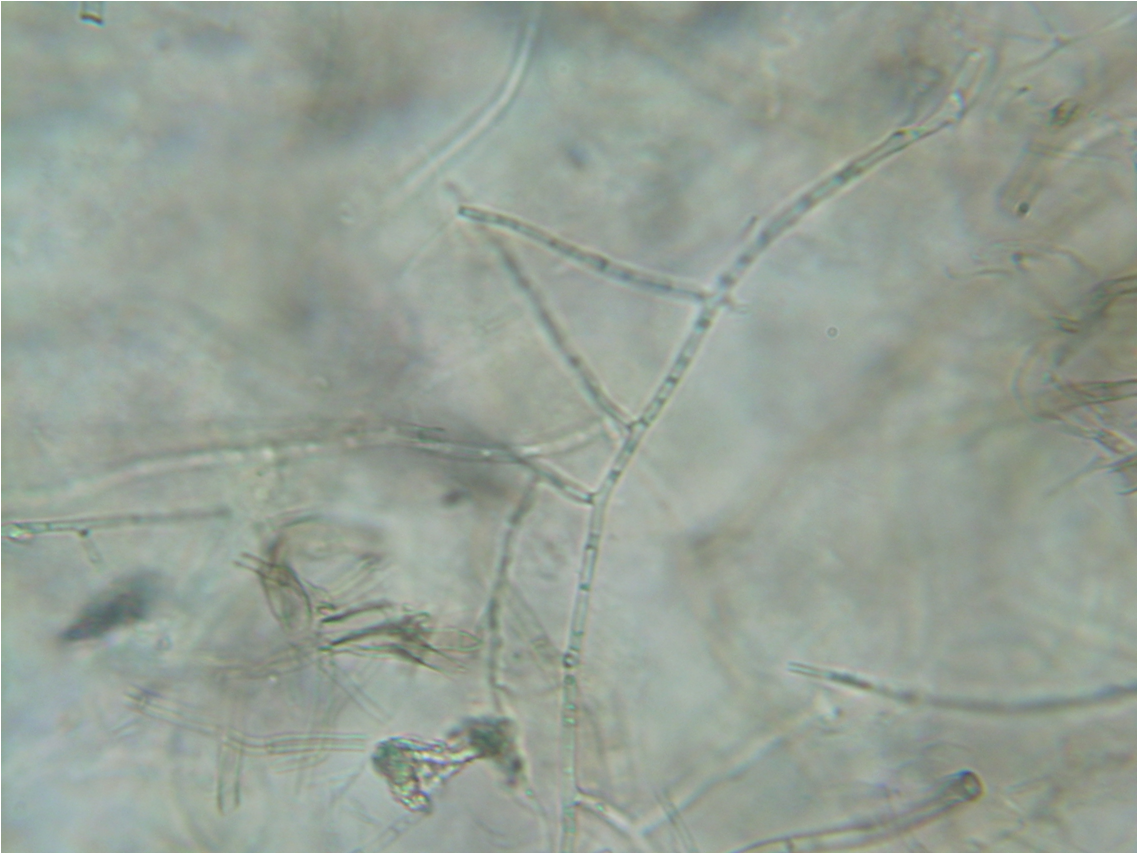
A 160x magnification of Rhizoctonia solani hyphae

A single filament of a mycelium. From Gr. hyphe, weaving.
hyphal
Of, or pertaining to, a hypha.
Hyphomycetes

An artificial class of mitosporic fungi that reproduces asexually. Traditionally subdivided into Agonomycetales, Hyphomycetales, Stilbellales, and Tuberculariales.
hypnospore

A thick-walled resting spore; germinates only after a lapse of weeks or months. From Gr. hypnos, sleep.
hypo-
Prefix meaning "under" or "lower". From Gr. hypo.
hypothallus

1. (Of lichens) The first growth of the hyphae, before differentiation has taken place. Usually of a crustaceous lichen's earliest stage, lacking a cortex and photobiont. Often persists as a colored layer on the bottom of the later stages of maturation.
2. (of slime molds) a thin layer on the surface not used up in sporangial development.

== I ==
inoperculate
Not operculate; lacking an operculum. Generally refers to asci or sporangia that discharge spores by an irregular apical opening or pore instead. Found in various Discomycetes and most other ascomycetes.
intercalary
1. (of growth) Between the apex and the base; not apical. From Latin intercalare, to insert.
2. (of cells) Between two cells.
isidium

A propagule for lichen growth; can both increase the surface area of a lichen and become detached from the thallus to disperse the lichen. Isidia are structures larger than soredia, and contain both the mycobiont and the photobiont. They are usually cylindrical, but can also be verrucose, clavate, and other shapes.
isokont

Zoospores with flagella of roughly equal length. Seen in Ectrogella bacillariacearum and other aquatic zoosporic fungi. From Gr. kontos, a pole.

== J ==
jelly fungus

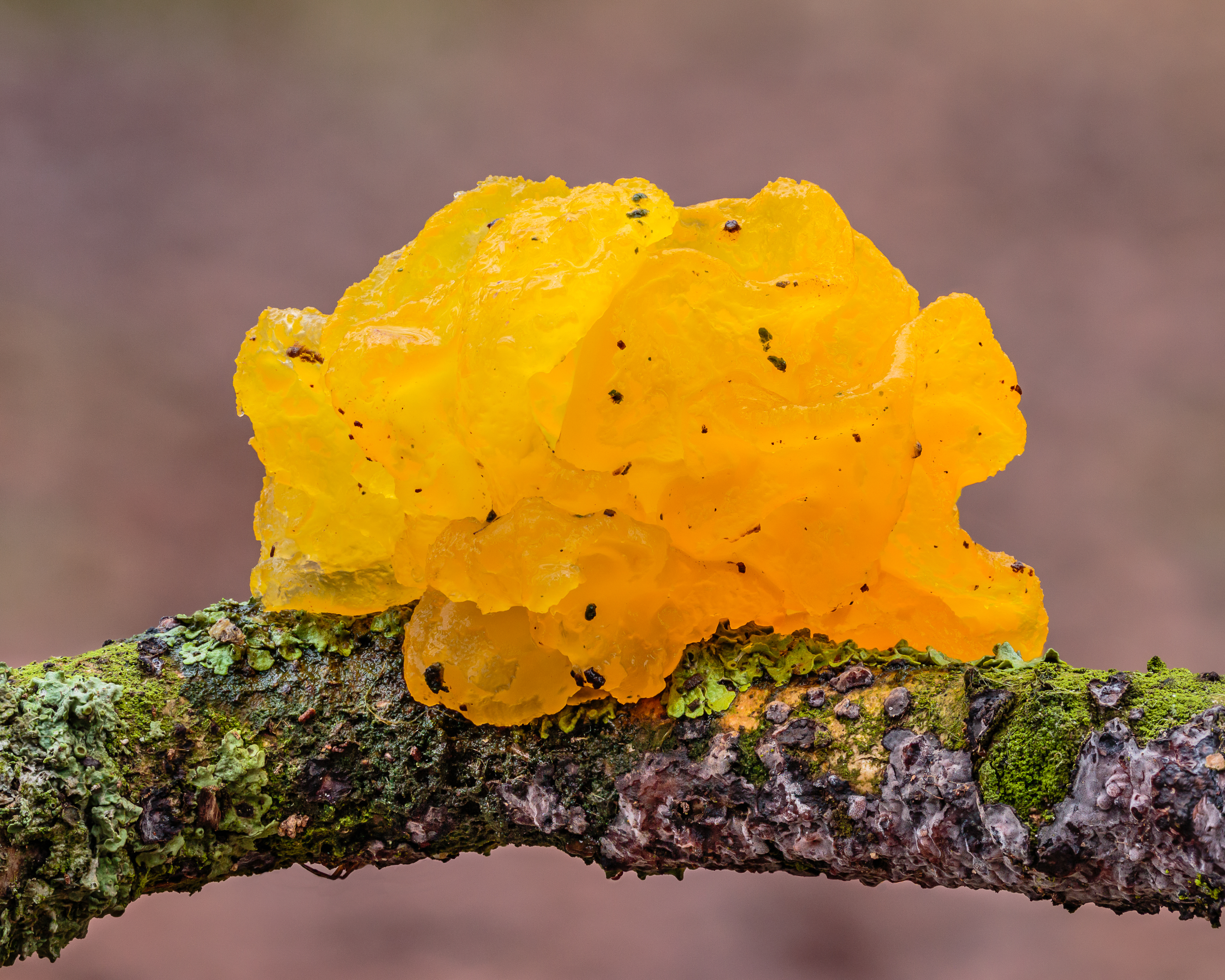
A jelly fungus, Tremella mesenterica

Fungi of the Tremellales or trembling fungi. Known for having a soft, elastic consistency, similar to gelatin or jelly.

== K ==
kary-

A prefix meaning "nucleus." From Gr. karyon.
karyogamy

The final stage in the fusion of two sexual nuclei, after plasmogamy, that forms the zygote nucleus, but before meiosis.
kinetosome

An organelle that is the base of a zoospore flagellum. Connected to the nuclear membrane by means of a rhizoplast. Found in Blastocladia and Rhizophydiales, for example.

== L ==
lageniform
Flask-shaped; swollen at base, narrowed at top.
lamella

A gill; a hymenium-covered vertical plate, generally of an agaric. Attaches to the stipe in a variety of ways, including: free, unattached; adnate, attached; adnexed, a partial attachment; sinuate, similar to adnate but with an S-shaped curve; decurrent, attached and also running further down the surface of the stipe. From Latin lamina, a thin plate.
lamellate
1. Having lamellae (gills).
2. Made up of thin plates.
lanate

Like wool; covered with short-hair-like elements.
lateral
At the side, e.g. of a stipe.
latex

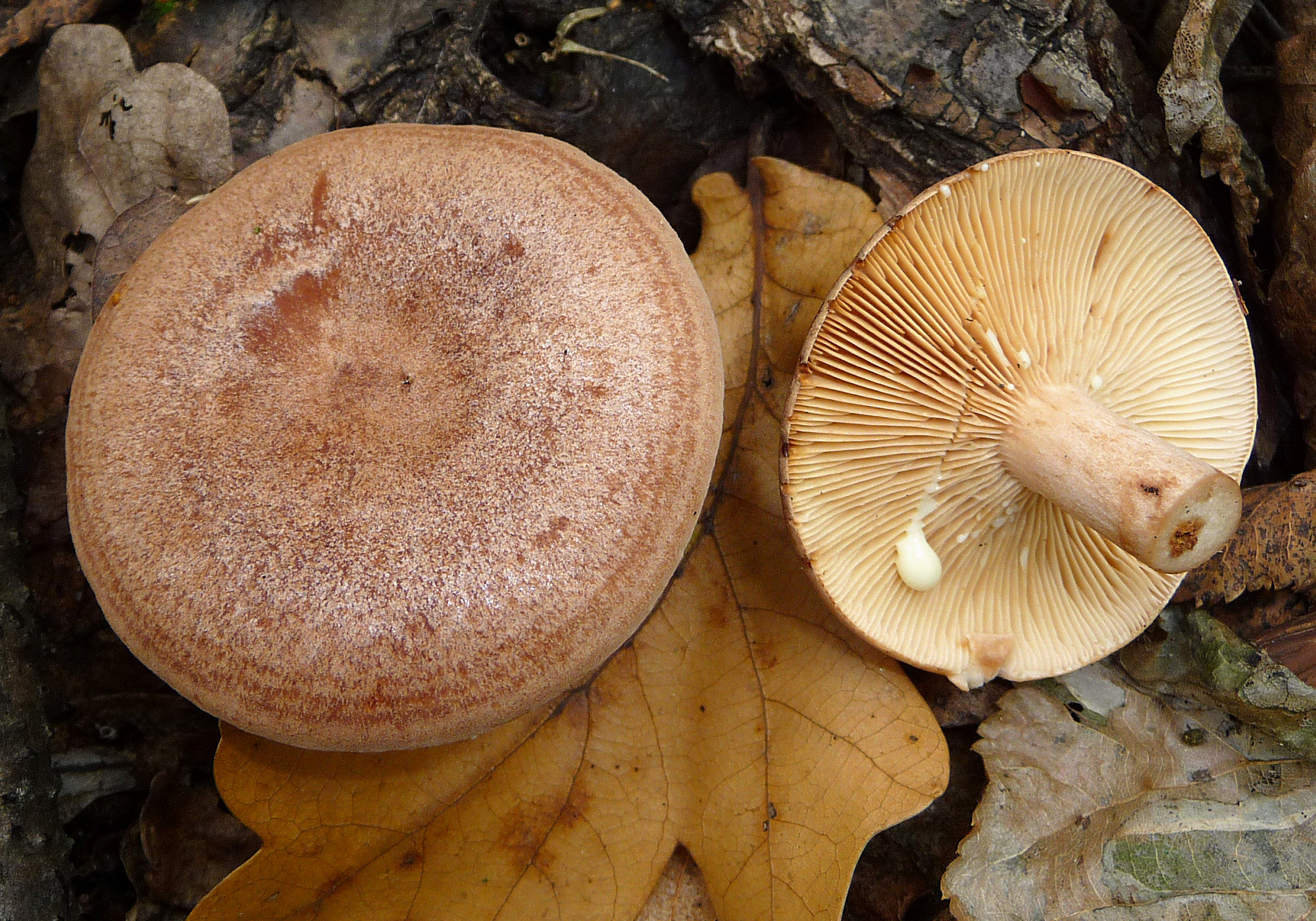
Lactarius quietus exuding cream-colored latex from gills upon being cut

A milk-like juice that flows from some fungi when cut or damaged, as in Lactarius.
latticed
Cross-barred. (See also Clathrus, lattice-work fungus, especially Clathrus ruber.)
lenticular

Shaped like a double convex lens.
lepidote
Covered in small scales; for example, the pileus of Lepiota.
lichen

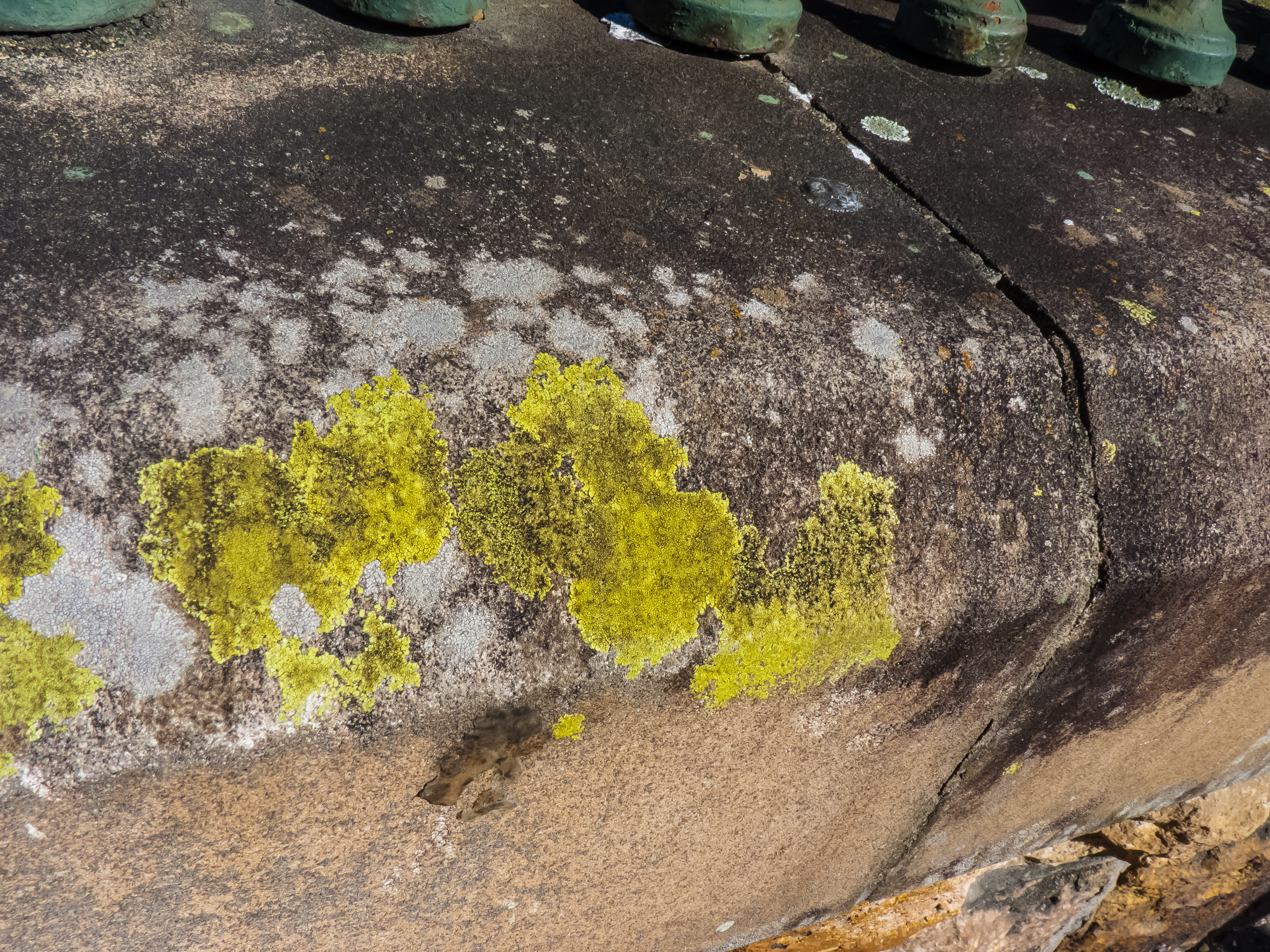
Crustose lichens can grow on surfaces hostile to most other lifeforms, such as concrete walls and bare boulders.

A dual organism that arises from an association of fungi (mycobiont) and algae or cyanobacteria (photobiont). The two coexist in a mutualistic relationship as partners; the resulting lifeform differs markedly from its isolated components.
lichenicolous
Growing on or in lichens. Can apply to both lichenicolous fungus and other lichens.
lichenin

A polycarbohydrate found in wall of the hyphae of many lichen-forming fungi, most characteristically Iceland moss.
lichenoid
Resembling a lichen.
lichenology
The scientific study of lichens.
lichenometry

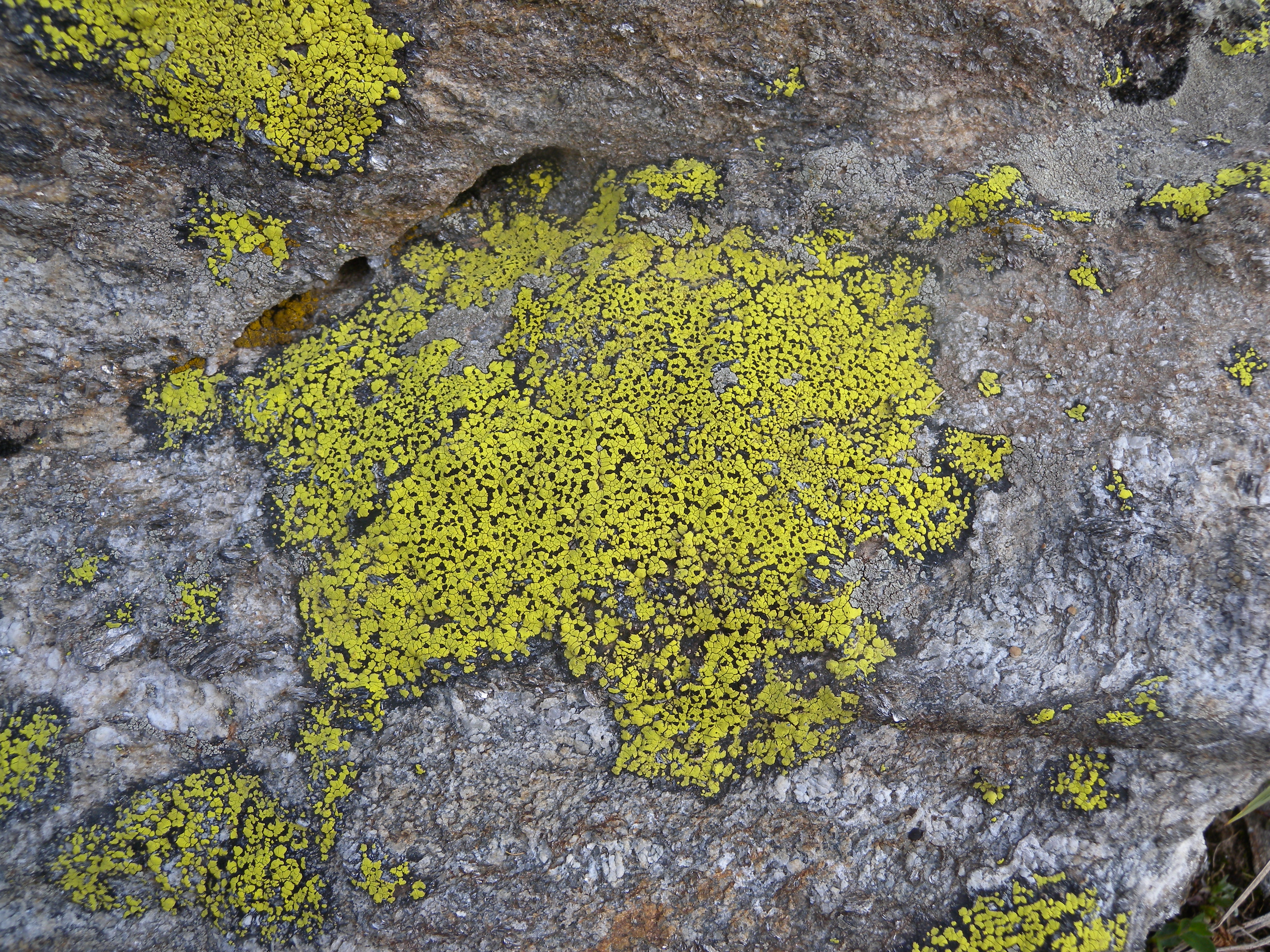
Rhizocarpon geographicum (map lichen) in Switzerland

A technique for studying the exposure age of rock surfaces based on the size and diameter of lichen thalli. Used extensively in glaciology. Most frequently uses map lichen for dating. Lichenometry has been used to date Easter Island moai among other elements.
ligneous

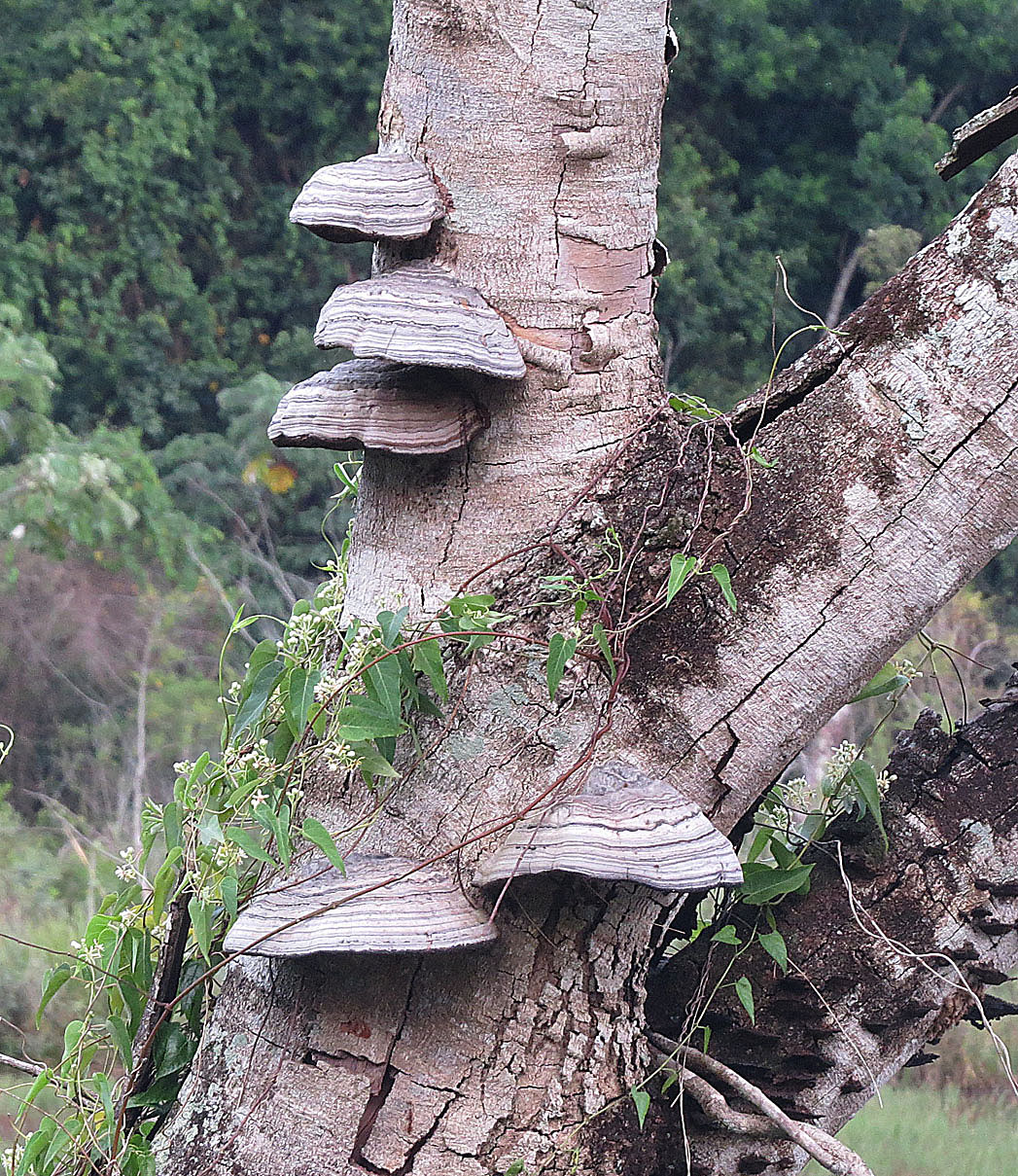
Woody, ligneous growths of Fomes fasciatus on a tree

Wood-like; having the consistency of wood, such as the fruiting body in Fomes, Ganoderma, or other Aphyllophorales.
lignicolous

Living in or on wood, although not necessarily deriving nourishment from it, as do wood-decay fungi.
limoniform
Lemon-shaped.
lunate

Crescent-shaped, like a crescent moon. Sometimes synonymous with falcate. From Latin luna, moon.
lumen
The central cavity of a structure, usually referring to a cell bounded by tissue or cell walls.
luminescent fungi

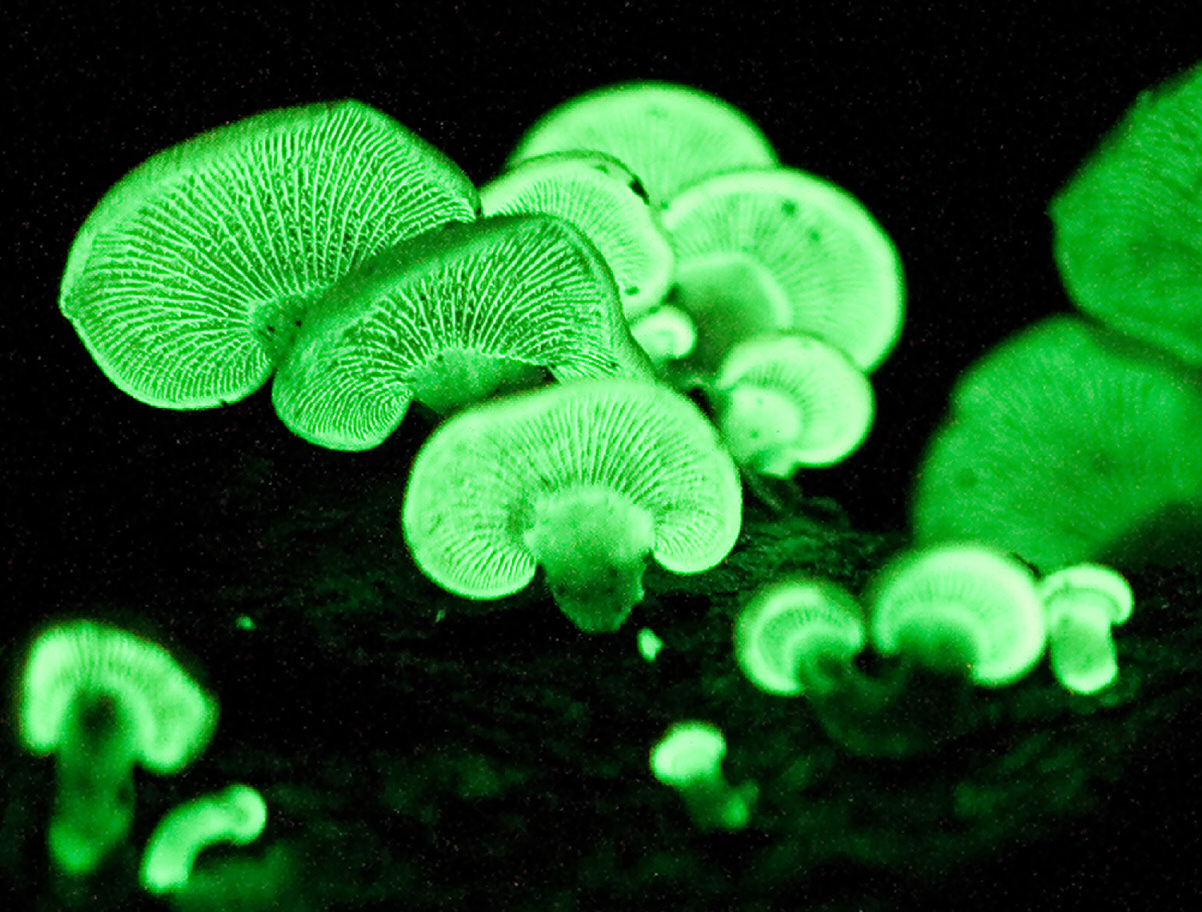
Panellus stipticus displaying bioluminescence

Fungi that exhibit bioluminescence, emitting light in certain conditions.

== M ==
macroconidium
In fungi with multiple types of conidia, the larger; compare microconidia, mesoconidia.
Macromycetes
Large fungi with visible sporocarps, such as mushrooms.
macronematous
Having a morphologically different conidiophore from the vegetative hyphae; a specialized conidiophore.
maculate

Spotted; blotched.
mantle

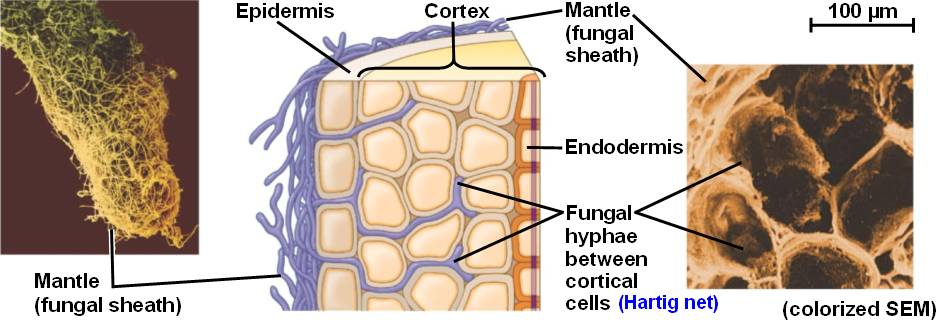
An illustration of ectomycorrhiza

A layer of hyphae covering the roots of ectomycorrhizal plants, generally trees. Connected to a Hartig net on the inside, and extramatrical hyphae on the outside.
matrix
1. The substance in or on which a fungus grows.
2. The mucilaginous material in which conidia and some ascospores are produced.
marginal veil
In agarics and boletes, a proliferation of hyphae on the edge of the pileus that protects the developing hymenium.
medicinal fungi

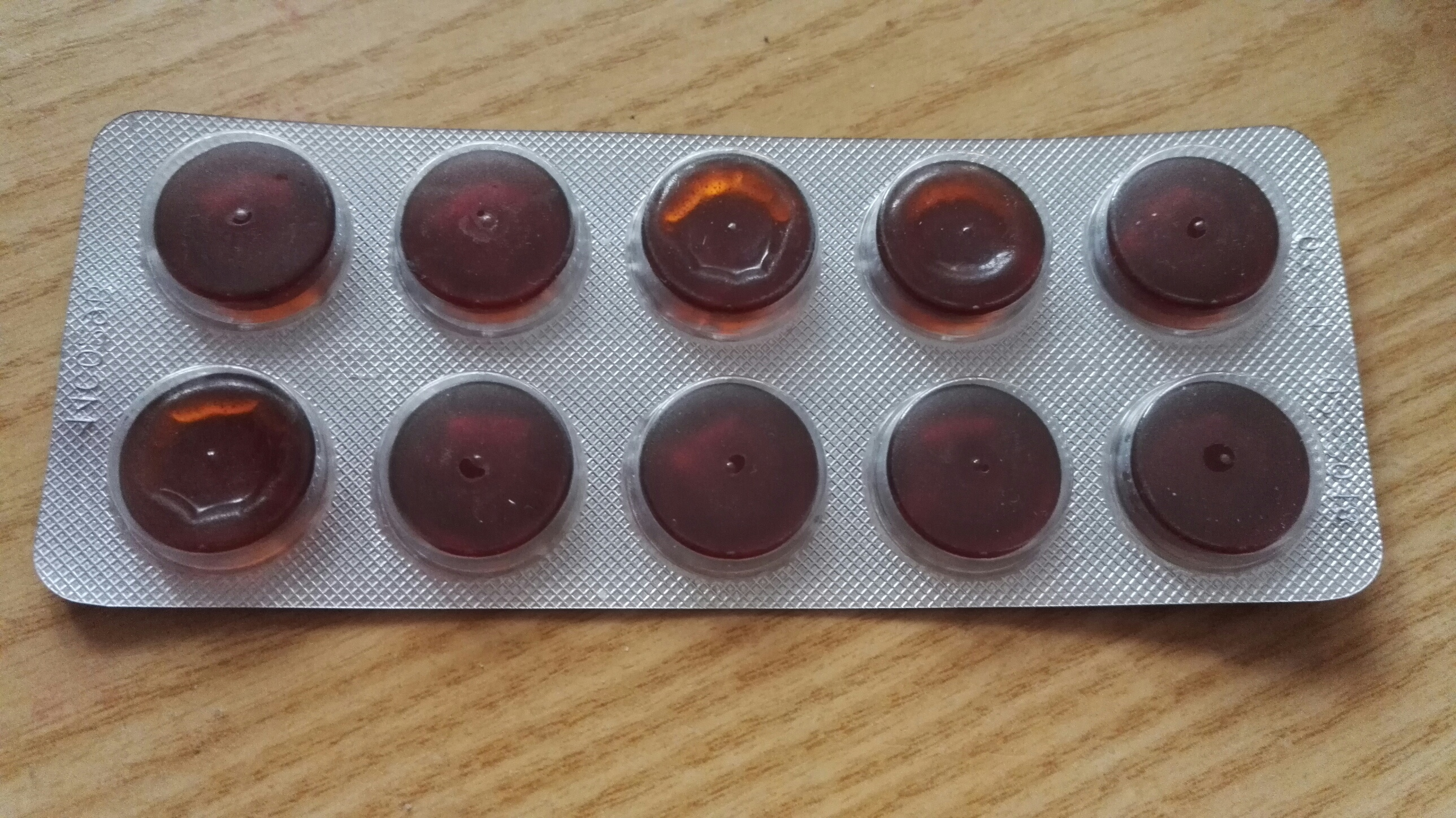
Tablets of cough suppressant made from Cetraria islandica (Iceland moss)

The use of fungi such as yeast in medicines.
meiosis
A series of two successive nuclear divisions that reduces the number of chromosomes by one-half, going from a diploid state to a haploid one. The last part of the sexual phase in many fungi, following plasmogamy and karyogamy. Contrast with mitosis.
merosporangium

A sporangium that is a cylindrical outgrowth from the swollen tip of a sporangiophore. A chain-like row of sporangiospores are produced there. Characteristic of Mucorales; also found in some other zygomycetes.
microbiota
All of the microorganisms present in an area, including algae, bacteria, protozoa, and fungi. Compare mycobiota.
microconidium
In fungi with multiple types of conidia, the smaller; compare macroconidia, mesoconidia.
micronematous

1. Having hyphae of small diameter.
2. Having conidiophores similar morphologically to vegetative hyphae.
mildew
1.

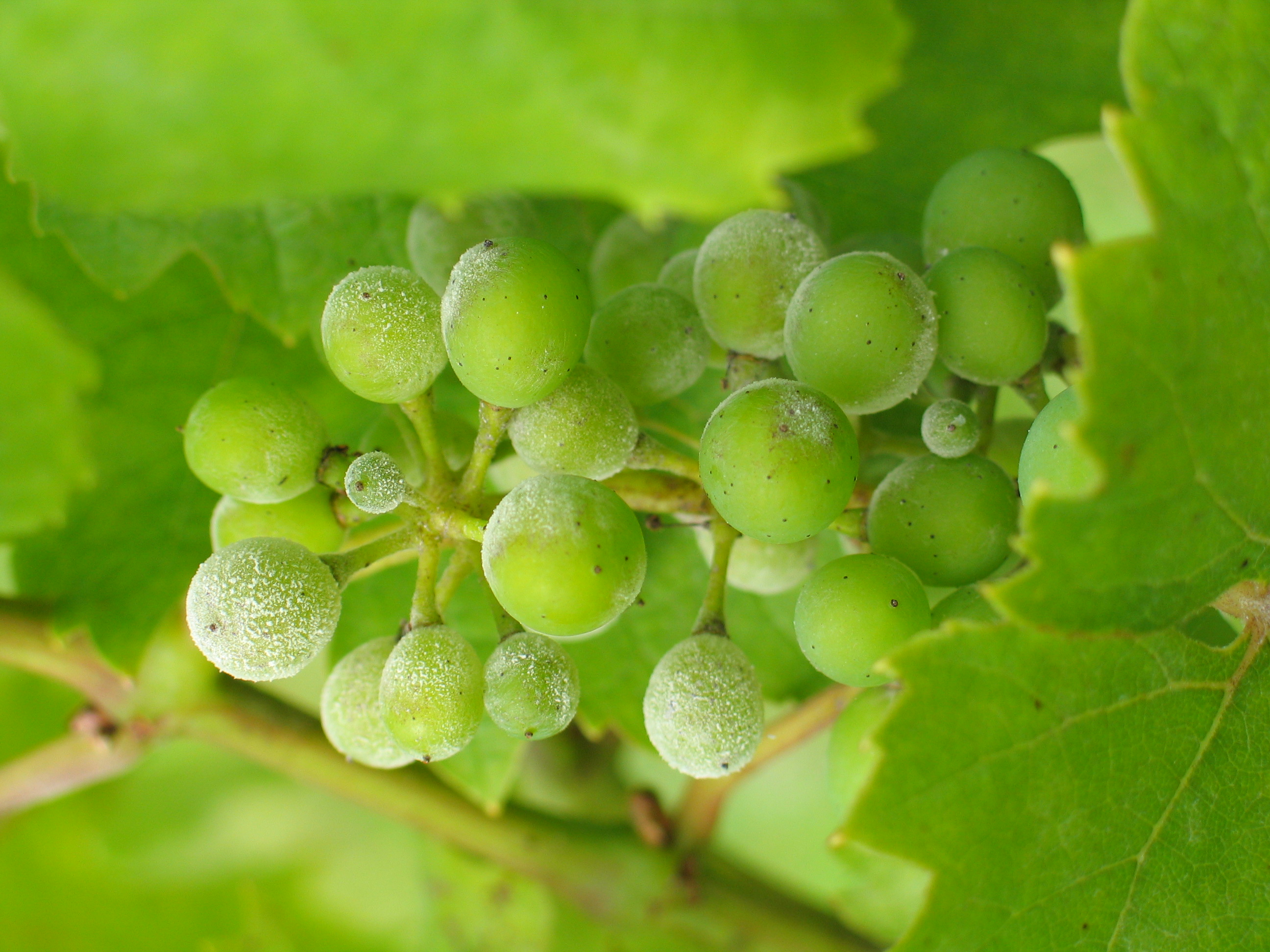
Uncinula necator, a powdery mildew that grows on grapes

Fungi that grow on host plants. Subdivided into powdery mildew ("true"), downy mildew ("false"), and dark mildew.
2. The plant disease caused by such fungi.
mitosis
The normal division of a nucleus. Results in two child nuclei with the same number of chromosomes as the parent.
mitosporangium
A thin-walled sporangium of certain Blastocladiales producing uninucleate diploid zoospores (mitospores) by mitosis.
mitospore
A zoospore from a mitosporangium. From Gr. mitos, thread.
mitosporic fungi

Purely asexual fungi that reproduce by mitosis.
mold

A fungus of very small size, usually with microscopic sporocarps.
monokaryotic

Cells having a single nucleus each; having genetically identical haploid nuclei (monokaryon or haplont). Found, for example, in the mycelium of Agaricales.
monopodial
A type of branching where there is a persistent main axis from which branches split from, one at a time, often in alternate or spiral series. Often uses acropetal succession. Compare with dichotomous.
morph
Form. From Gr. μορφή, morphḗ, form.
moss

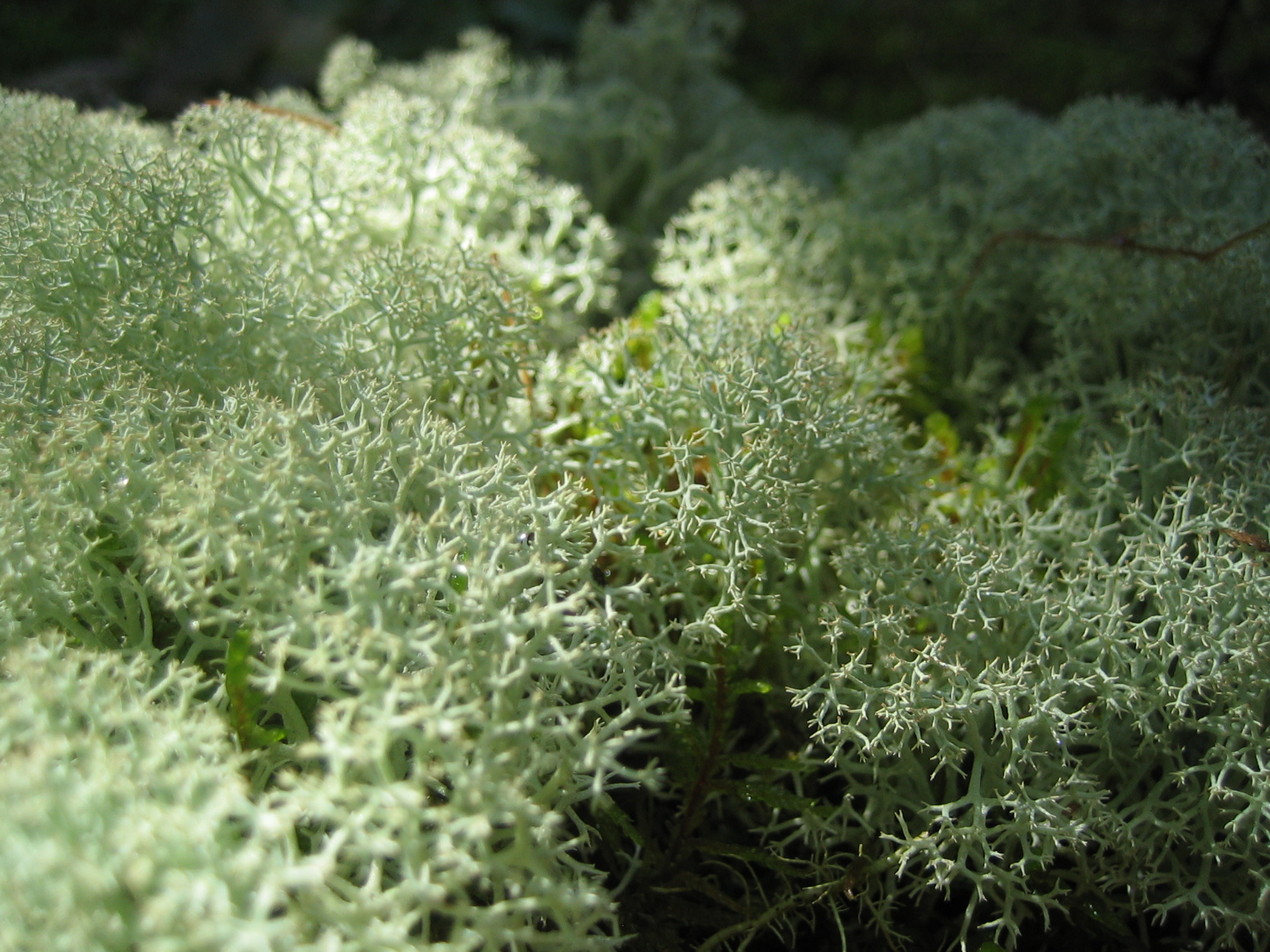
Reindeer moss or caribou moss, which is truly a lichen

Flowerless plants; not fungi. However, some lichens were given misnomers in the past that misidentified them as mosses, including oakmoss, Swedish moss, dyer's moss, Iceland moss, beard moss, and reindeer moss.
motile
Independently mobile.
mucilaginous
Sticky or viscous when wet; slimy. Present in many fungi and especially slime molds.
mucoid

Like mucus, having the consistency of mucilage; slimy.
Mucoromycota
A division of fungi broken off from Zygomycota in the 2010s that includes many of the molds, microscopic fungi. Includes Mucorales, the largest and most closely studied order of zygomycetes.
multiseptate
Having more than one septum.
muriform
Spores arranged like bricks in a wall; having both longitudinal and transverse septa. From Latin murus, wall.
mushroom

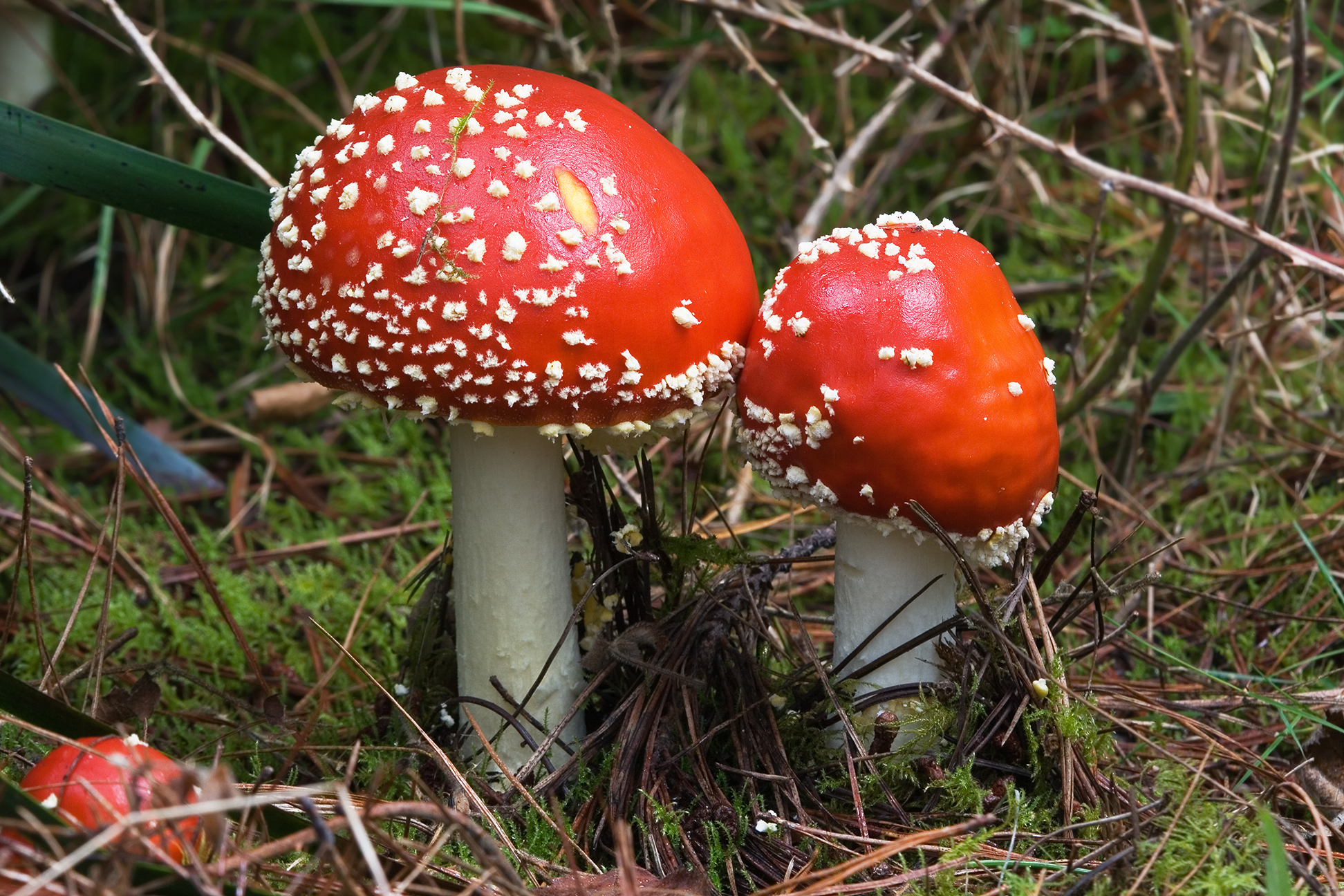
Amanita muscaria (fly agaric), an iconic mushroom

Large agarics, or other fleshy fungi such as boletes. Commonly divided into mushrooms (human-edible) and toadstools (inedible).
myc-

Combining prefixes that mean "fungus". From Gr. mykēs and mykētos (μύκης), fungus.
mycelial cord
A discrete aggregation of hyphae. Compared to a rhizomorph, it is undifferentiated from other hyphae and has no apical meristem.
mycelium

A mass of hyphae or fungal filaments; the thallus.
Mycetes
Fungi. As a suffix (-mycetes), the recommended ending for the names of fungal classes.
mycetism

Poisoning by larger fungi, usually mushrooms.
mycetoma

A fungal disease of the skin, usually of the foot.
mycobiont
The fungal part of a lichen.
mycobiota

Aggregate fungal life in the area under consideration; equivalent of the term flora in plants or fauna in animals.
mycogenous
Coming from fungi; growing on fungi.
mycoid
Fungus-like.
mycology
The scientific study of fungi. From Gr. lógos, discourse.
mycorrhiza

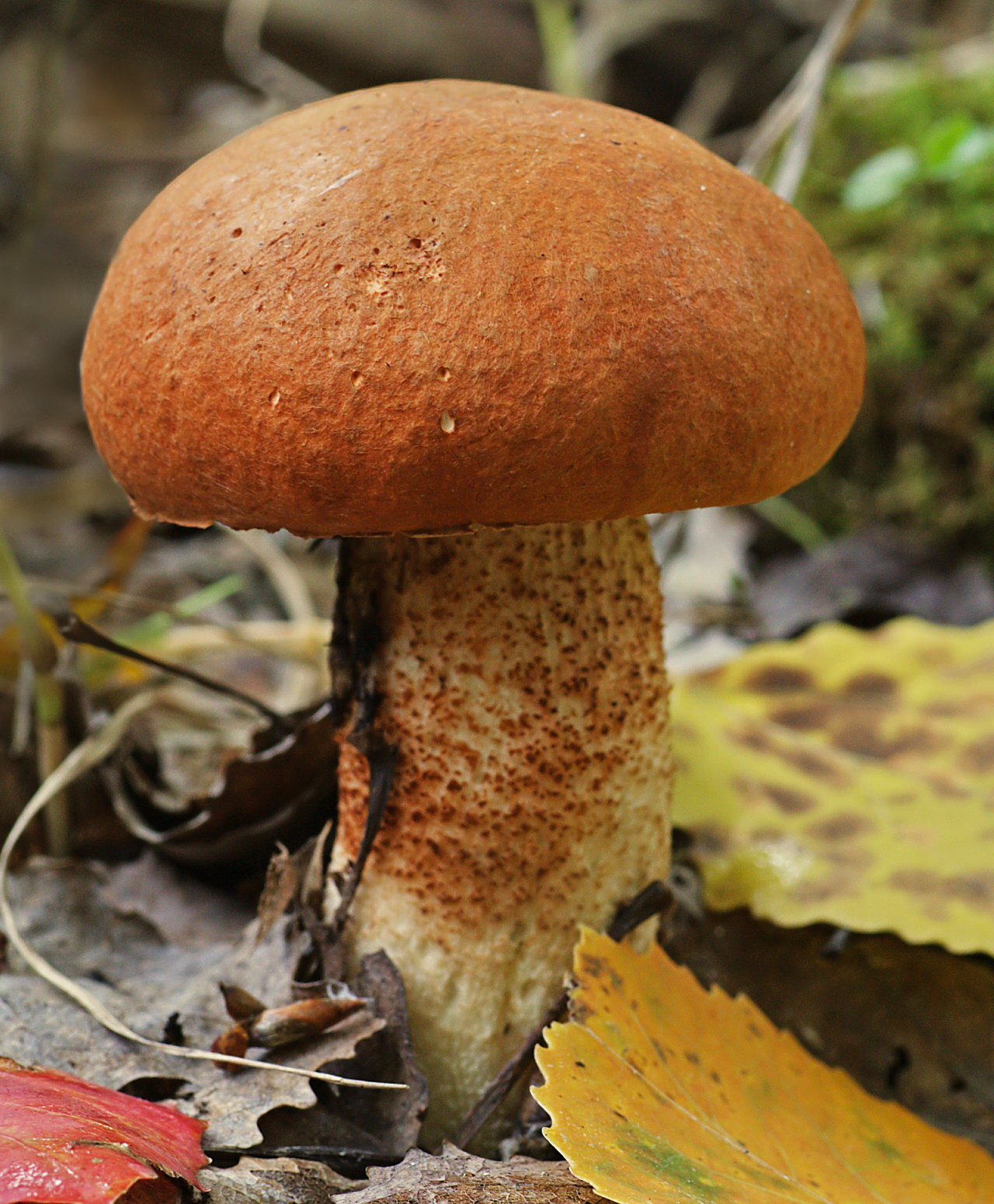
Leccinum aurantiacum, a bolete that has a mycorrhizal relationship with a host tree

A symbiotic association between a fungus and the root system of a plant, usually trees. Traditionally subdivided into ectotrophic, where the fungus forms a sheaf on the surface of the root to create a 'Hartig net', and endotropic, where fungal hyphae directly enter the cortical cells of the root. Later, more precise divisions included ectomycorrhiza, arbuscular mycorrhiza, ericoid mycorrhiza, orchid mycorrhiza, arbutoid mycorrhiza, and monotropoid mycorrhiza.
mycosis

Fungal diseases of humans and animals (rarely, plants as well).
-mycota
The recommended ending of the name of fungal phyla.
mycotoxin
Toxins (the product of one organism injurious to another) produced by fungi. Studied by mycotoxicology. Poisonings are called mycotoxicoses.
Myxomycota

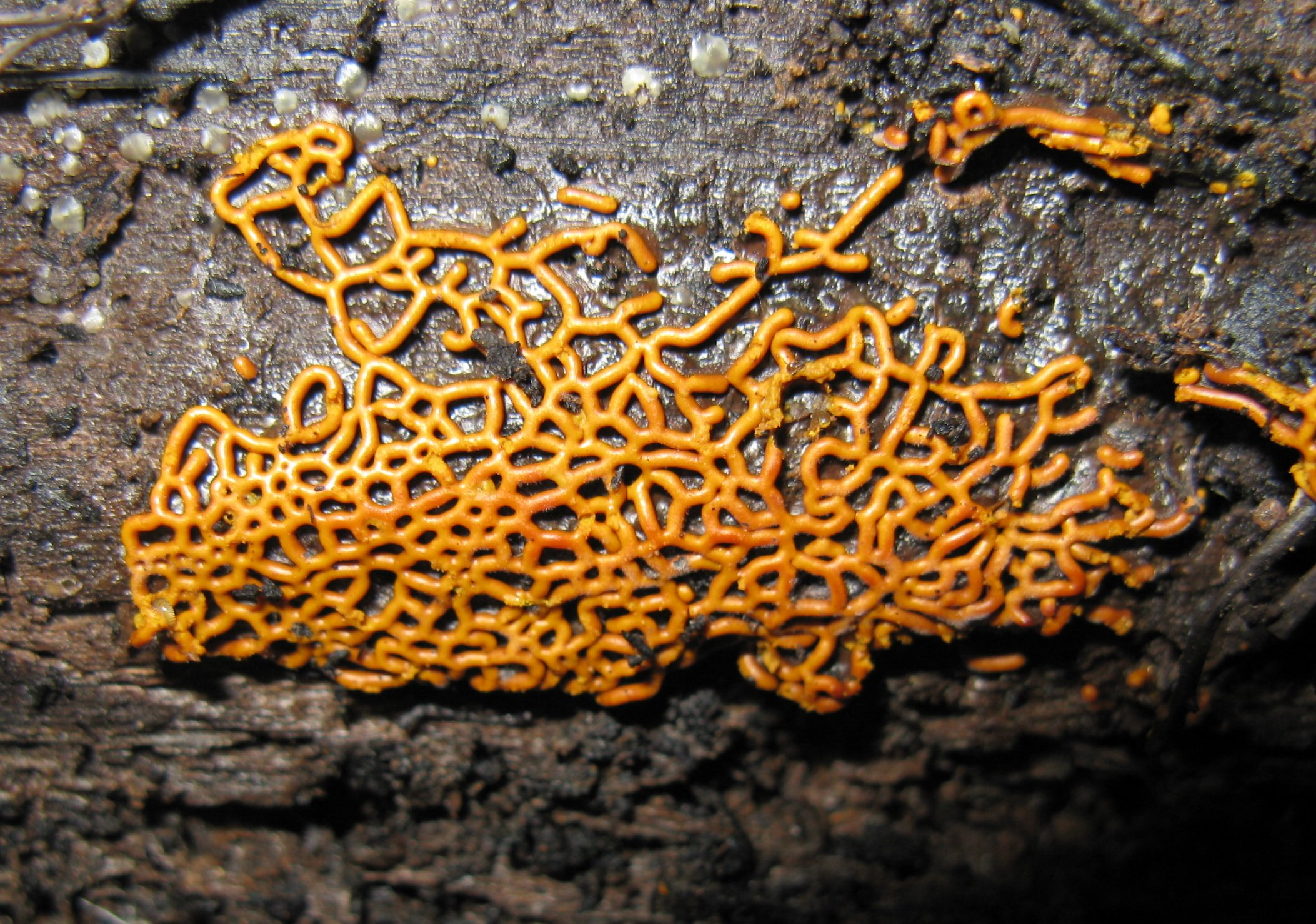
Hemitrichia serpula, commonly called pretzel slime, a true slime mold

True slime molds. No longer categorized as fungi, but were formerly categorized as such in older literature, and still studied in mycology; now considered part of Amorphea. Since reclassified as Myxogastria. From Gr. myxa, slime.

== N ==
nematophagous

Predatory fungi that trap, devour, and digest nematodes in the soil.
noble rot

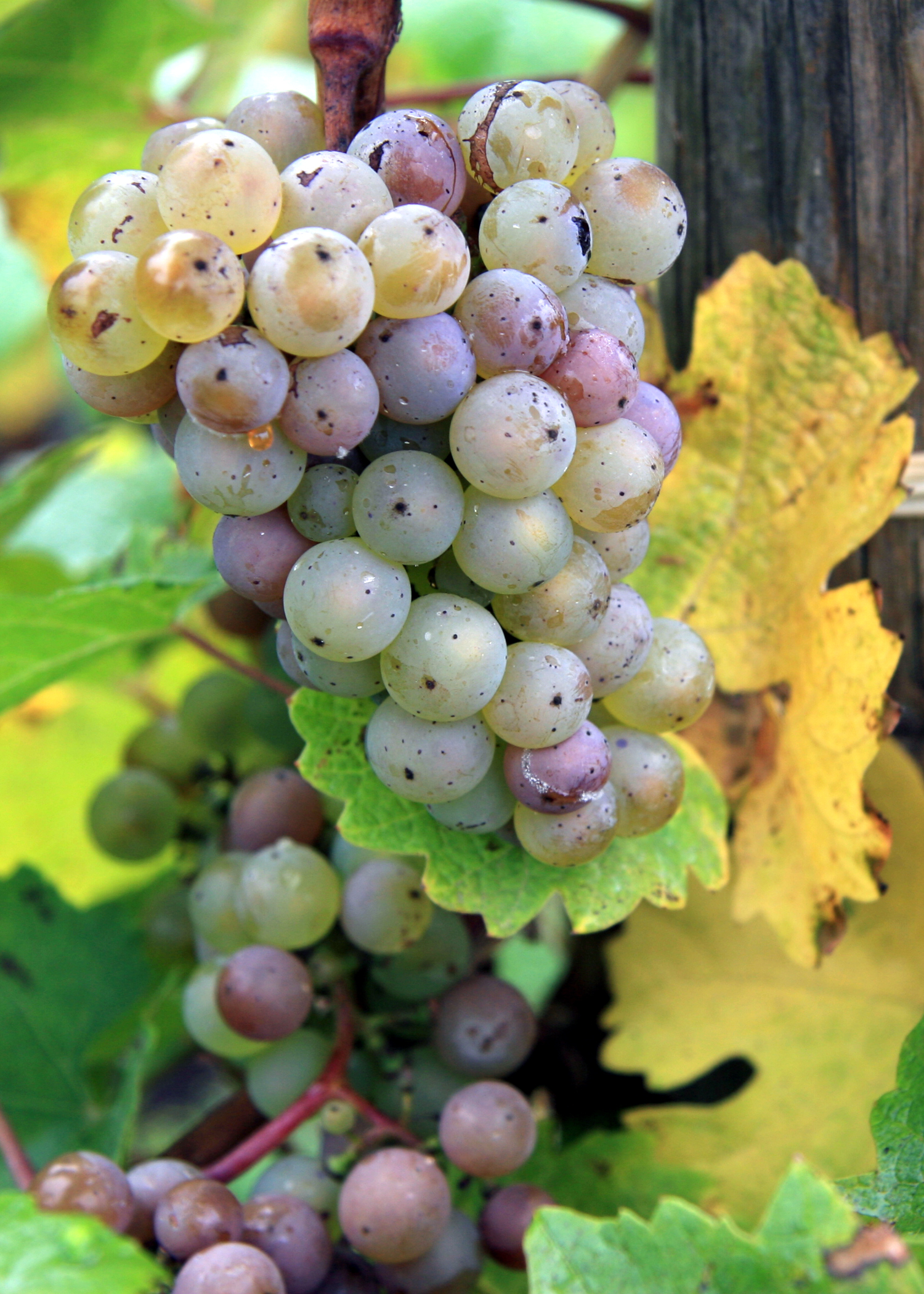
Riesling grapes afflicted by Botrytis cinerea (gray rot), causing a color change

A condition from the mold Botrytis growing on overripe grapes. Used in the production of certain sweet wines.

== O ==
obclavate
(of spores, stipe, cystidia, etc.) The reverse of clavate; widest at the base.
obpyriform
The reverse of pear-shaped or pyriform.
obovoid
The reverse of egg-shaped or ovoid; the narrower end is on bottom.
oogonium

The female sexual organ of Oomycetes, which at maturity contains one or more oospores. From Gr. gonos, progeny.
Oomycota

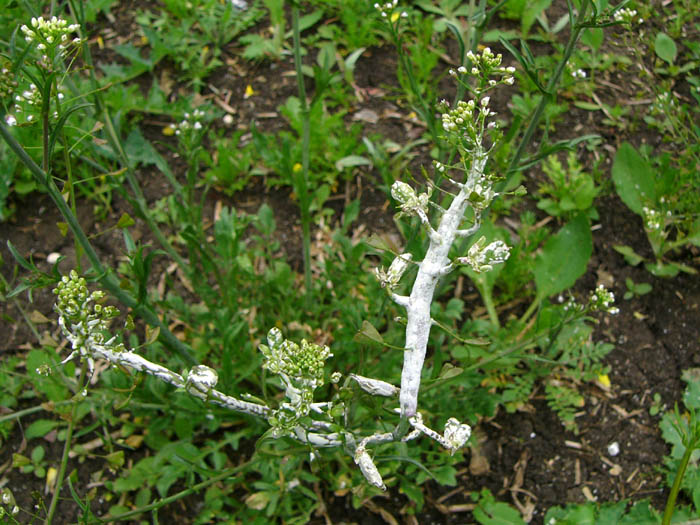
Albugo candida (white rust), a water mold, on a mayflower

Water molds. Traditionally considered fungi, but now classed as closer to algae. Part of the Chromista kingdom. Contain cellulose in their cell walls rather than chitin, and coenocytic hypae rather than septate hyphae.
oosphere
Female gamete of oomycetes; "egg" of the oogonium.
oospore

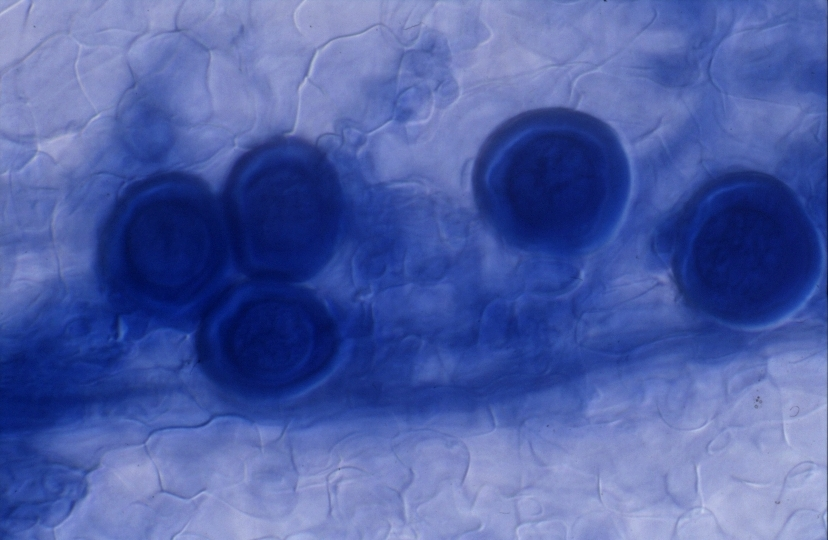
400x magnification showing oospores of Hyaloperonospora parasitica, a downy mildew

The resting spore formed as a result of fertilization of the oosphere. Has a thick, resistant wall. Subdivided into centric, subcentric, subeccentric, and eccentric oospores by its structure.
orchil

A reddish-purple dye traditionally extracted from lichen.
operculum

A lid or cover. Usually refers to the lid-like apex of a sporangium or ascus found in some chytrids and Pezizales.
osmotrophic
Absorbing nutrients from surroundings via osmosis. True of all fungi.
ostiole
1. A cavity ending in a pore at the neck of a perithecium (ascocarp) of ascomycetes.
2. Any pore by which spores are freed from a fruit body, including both the ascocarp version as well as the opening of a pycnidium.
ovoid
Egg-shaped; the narrower end is on top.

== P ==
papilla
A small rounded elevation. Generally refers to an elevation on the wall of the sporangium which on breaking serves as the exit point of zoospores and planogametes.
paraphysis

A sterile upward-growing, basally-attached hypha in a hymenium, especially in ascomata of ascomycetes where they are generally filiform and clavate. The free ends frequently converge toward the ostiole and make a structure called an epithecium over the asci. Part of the hamathecium. Has a number of minor variants distinguished by names such as paraphysoid, pseudoparaphysis, pseudophysis, dikaryoparaphysis, and hyphidium.
partial veil

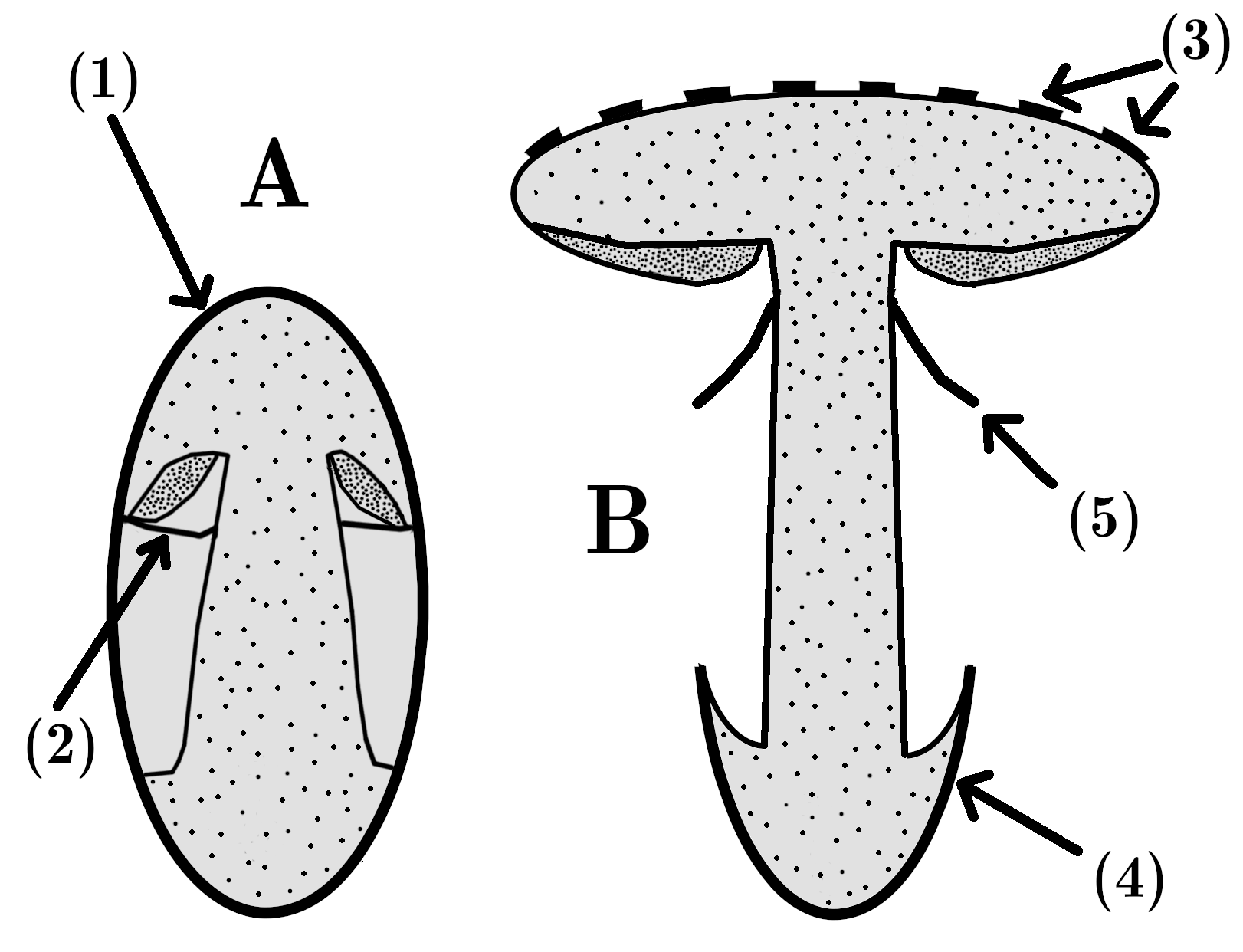
A sample agaric-type basidioma in (A) the early development stage, and (B) after the body is fully expanded. (1) is the universal veil, the outer layer protecting the developing basidioma; (2) is the partial veil, which covers the gills; (3) are cap scales, remnants of the universal veil; (4) is the volva, another remnant of the universal veil, but at the base of the basidioma; (5) is the annulus, a ring-like mark on the stipe that is a remnant of the partial veil, and whose overhanging tissue may become a cortina.

A layer of tissue that joins the stipe to the edge of the pileus in agarics, covering the gills during hymenium development. May become an annulus or a cortina after development is complete.
pectinate
Resembling the teeth of a comb, e.g. of the margin of a pileus.
pedicel
A small or slender stalk.
pellicle
1. The outermost living layer.
2. A thin film-like growth on the surface of a liquid culture, e.g. on yeasts.
3. (of agaric basidiomata) A delicate skin-like cuticle of the pileus that can break off.
penicillus

An asexual conidial head in the shape of a brush. Consists of a pedicel or conidiophore that supports a cluster of conidiogenous cells (phialides). Characteristic of Penicillium stipes.
percurrent
1. Conidiogenous cell growth where a conidiophore or germ tube grows through a preexisting pore.
2. Of a columella, extending throughout the entire length, from the base of the gleba through to the peridium's apex. Found in gastromycetes such as Podaxis. Also called a stipe-columella or dendritic columella.
peridium
The outer wall of a sporangium or other fruiting body. Can be either acellular or composed of plectenchyma.
perithecium

A rounded, oval ascocarp, characteristic of Pyrenomycetes and pyrenolichens. Can commonly be pyriform, obpyriform, beaked, or lageniform.
phagotrophic
Feeding by engulfing food; extending a pseudopod or other protoplasmic extension, as seen in protozoa. Never seen in true fungi (Eumycota), but some Pseudofungi use this in addition to osmocytosis, e.g. Myxomycetes.
phialide
A type of conidiogenous cell, bottle-shaped, that produces blastic conidia (phialospores) in basipetal succession. The philade itself does not increase in length. The most common conidiogenous cell among conidial fungi. From Gr. phiale, jar.
phialospore
An asexual spore formed from the tip of a phialide. Formed by abstriction.
photobiont
The photosynthetic element in a lichen. Either algae (a phycobiont) or cyanobacteria (a cyanobiont).
phototropism
A tropic phenomenon driven by light, where growth curves toward or against light stimuli. For example, sporangiphores of Pilobus and Phycomyces direct themselves toward light.
phragmospore
An asexual reproductive spore partitioned by two or more transverse septa. Most commonly found in mitosporic fungi. Compare with amerospore and didymospore.
physiological race

A group of forms alike in morphology. Often means a group of organisms that are potentially interbreeding. In plant pathology, it means a group with similar preferences in plants targeted; a race may be adapted to target only a single cultivar of a plant. Tracking the history of an organism is phylogeny. From Old Italian razza, generation.
piedra
A fungal infection of the hair, characterized by stony, hard nodules along hair shafts. A type of dermatocytosis.
pileus

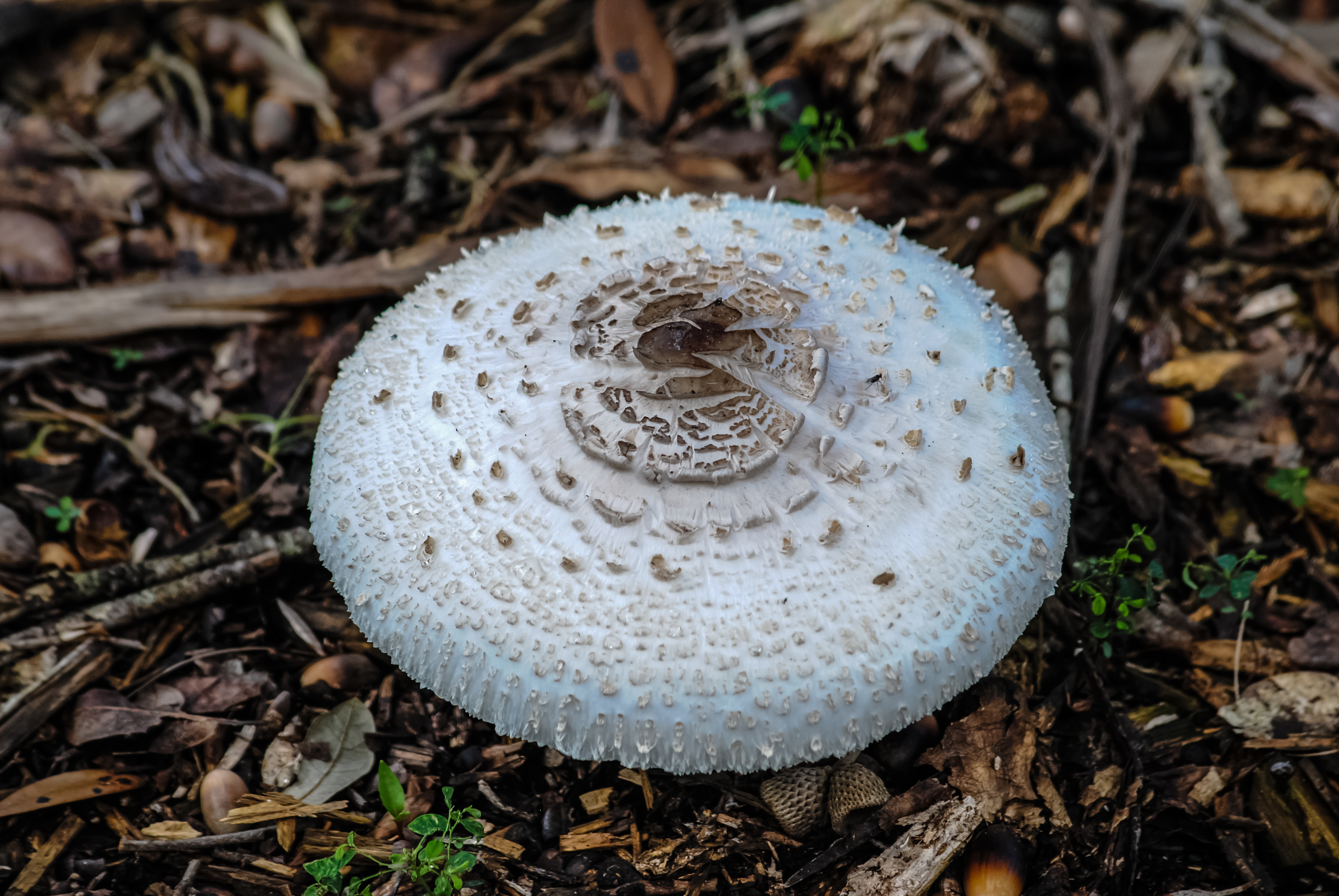
A pileus or mushroom cap

The cap of basidiomata that bears the fertile hymenium.
pilose
Covered with long, soft filaments; hairy. Oudemansiella pilosa is an example. From Latin pilus, hair.
plasmodium
A motile mass seen in the growth phase of acellular slime molds. Generally multinucleate and lacking cell walls. See also protoplasmodium, aphanoplasmodium, phaneroplasmodium, filoplasmodium, and pseudoplasmodium.
plasmogamy
The fusion of two cells or plasmodial cytoplasms, resulting in the nuclei juxtaposed and a dikaryon formed. In many sexual phases of fungi, the first step which precedes karyogamy (nuclear fusion) and meiosis.
plectenchyma
A thick, packed tissue of twisted hyphae formed during basidiocarp development as it enlarges and generative hyphae begin to differentiate. From Gr. plektos, to twist, and enchyma, infusion.
pleomorphic

1. Fungi having more than one form in its life cycle, e.g. holomorphs comprising a teleomorph and one or more anamorphs.
2. Of dermatophytes, having variations, especially changes brought by degeneration over time.
pleurogenous
Growing from the sides, e.g. of hyphae.
pore
1. A small opening, as in tretic conidiogenesis.
2. The mouth of a tube in certain fungi, such as Polyporaceae and Boletaceae.
potato blight

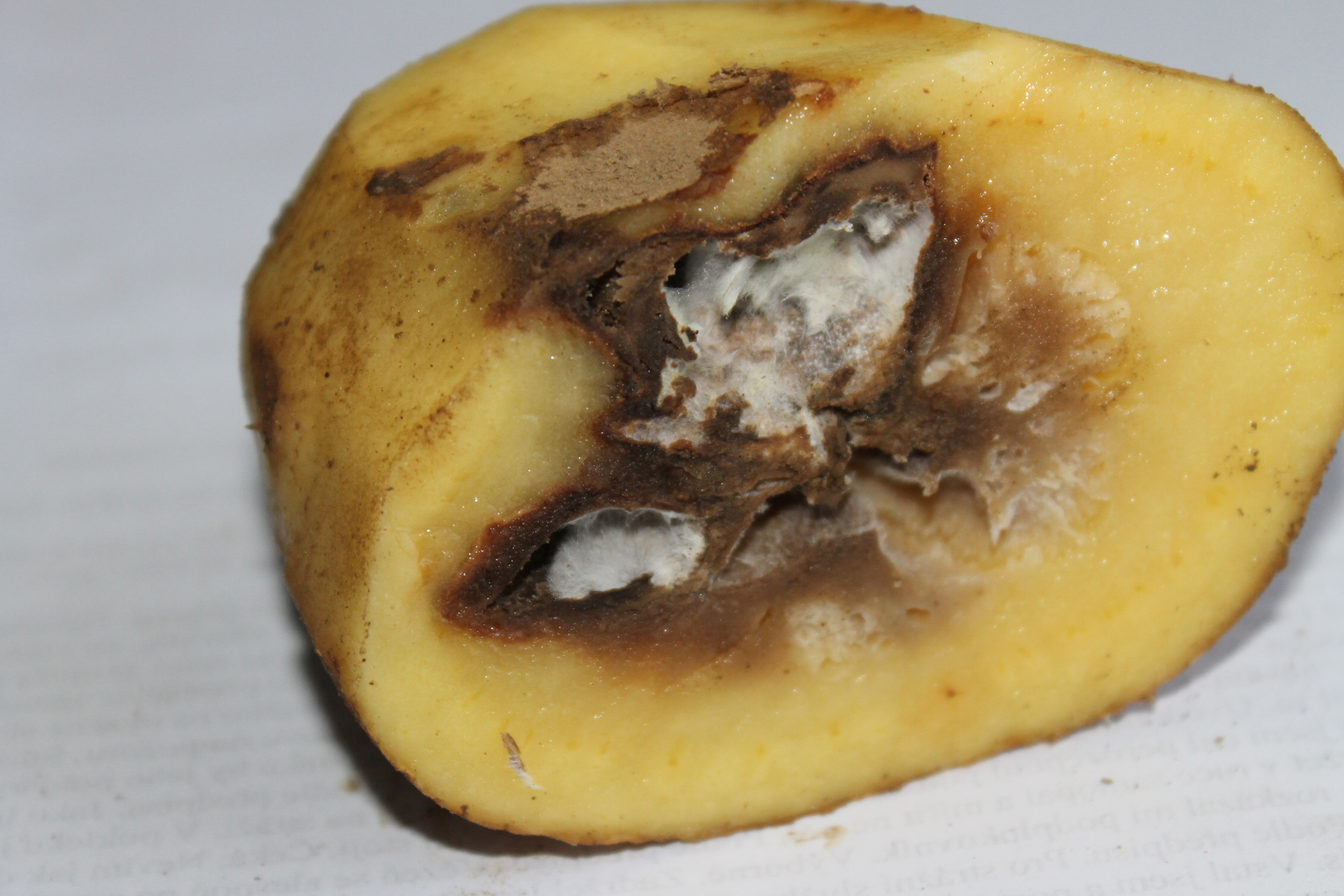
A potato afflicted by the potato late blight

A fungal disease caused by the water mold Phytophthora infestans; cause of the Great Famine of Ireland and other potato famines.
propagule

Any structure that serves to spread the organism, both via propagation of new organisms as well as vegetatively increasing a single organism's size. In fungi, generally spores, bulbils, fragments of mycelium, isidia, soredia, and others.
pseudo-
Prefix meaning "false", from Gr. pseudos.
pseudoidia
Separated hyphal cells capable of germination.
Pseudofungi

A subdivision of stramenopiles consisting of organisms similar to fungi and traditionally studied in mycology, including Oomycota, Hyphochytriomycota, Labyrinthulomycota, and Thraustochytriales. Contrasted with Eumycota, true fungi.
pseudoparenchyma

A type of plectenchyma made of tightly packed, angular or polyhedral cells.
pseudostroma

A stroma formed of both fungal tissue and remnant tissues of a host plant.
puffball

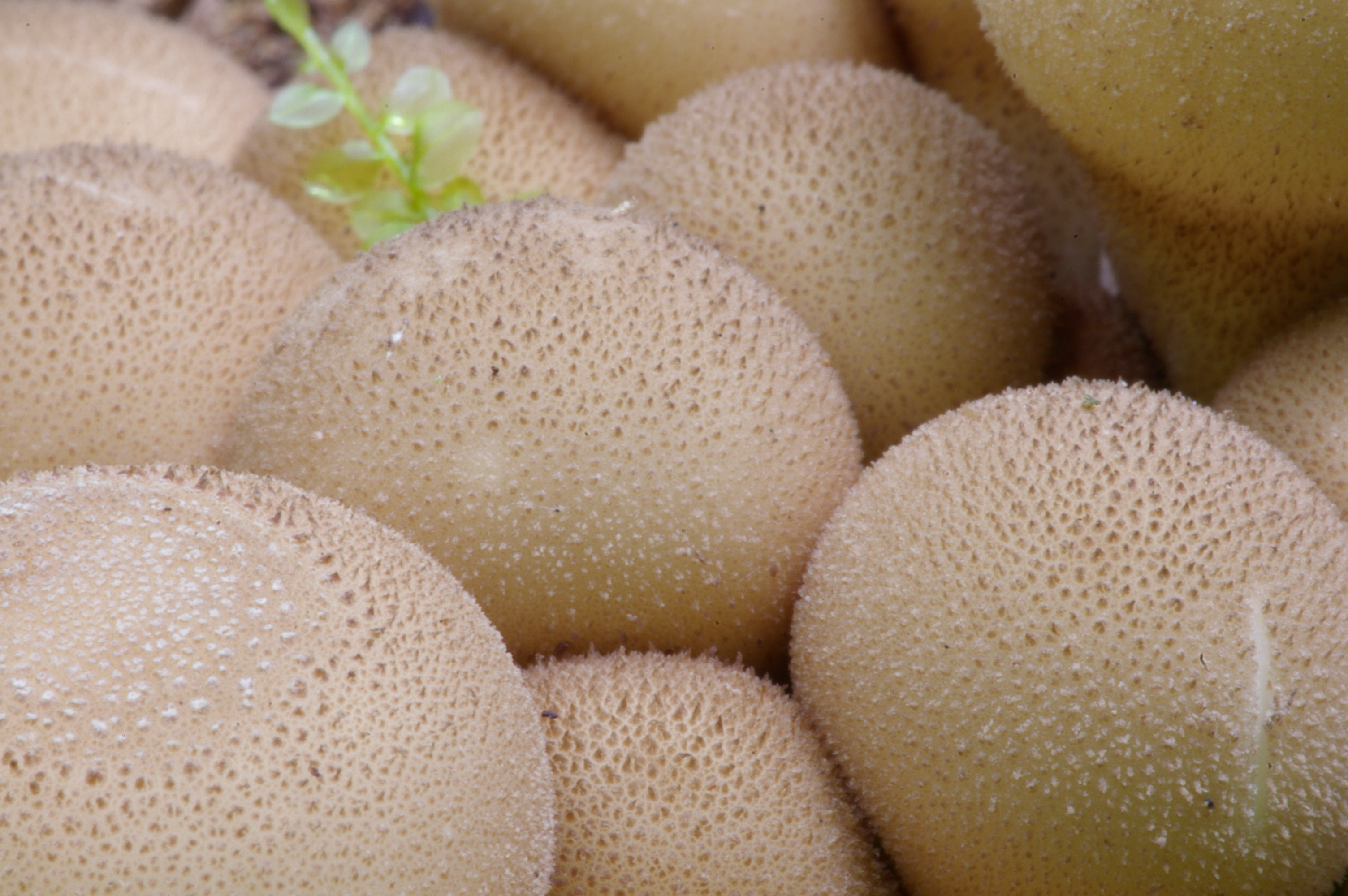
Puffballs of the species Lycoperdon pyriforme

Fruit body (basidioma) of Lycoperdales. Emits a cloud of spores when disturbed ("puffing").
punctiform
Very small (but still visible to unaided eyesight), e.g. with rust sori.
punctulate

Marked with small points.
putrescent
Decaying; becoming soft. From Latin putrescere, to grow rotten.
pycnidium

An asexual fruiting body (conidioma), generally flask-shaped, lined entirely by conidiogenous cells.
pyriform

Pear-shaped.

== R ==
rachis
A geniculate or zig-zag holoblastic extension of a conidiogenous cell from sympodial conidiogenous cell development. Such cells having a rachis are called rachiform. From Gr. ráchis, axis, spine.
racket cell
A hyphal cell having a swelling at one end, resembling a tennis racket; found in dermatophytes.
ramicolous
Living on plant branches or twigs.
reniform

Kidney-like or bean-like in form, e.g. of spores. From Latin renes, kidney, or faba, a broad bean.
retorse
Turned or bent backward.
rhizoid
A slender, tapered structure of anucleate filaments bearing a superficial resemblance to a plant root, as it is extended by the thallus of chytrids as a feeding organ. Generally part of a root system-like aggregation of branched hyphae.
rhizomorph
A strand or cord of mycelium, often with a dark-colored rind surrounding a central core of colorless cells, penetrating a soft substratum or between portions of it (e.g. between bark and wood). Unlike a mycelial cord, features distinct tissue, unlike "normal" hyphae. Functions as organ of absorption of nutritive substances. Seen in some Agaricales and Gasteromycetes.
rhizomycelium
A branched system of rhizoids that resembles a mycelium in chytrids.
Rozellida

A sister group of quasi-fungi that lack chitinous cell walls. Traditionally considered chytrids, but have since been separated and reclassified in the 2010s. Phagotrophs rather than osmotrophes. Rozella, a group of obligate endoparasites, is possibly the earliest diverging lineage of fungi.
ruderal
1. Living in wasteland, ruins, or debris.
2. Fungi having a high growth rate, rapid germination of spores, and short life expectancy.
rugose
Wrinkled. Seen, e.g., in basidiospores of Panaeolina foenisecii. From Latin ruga, wrinkle or crease.
rust
1.

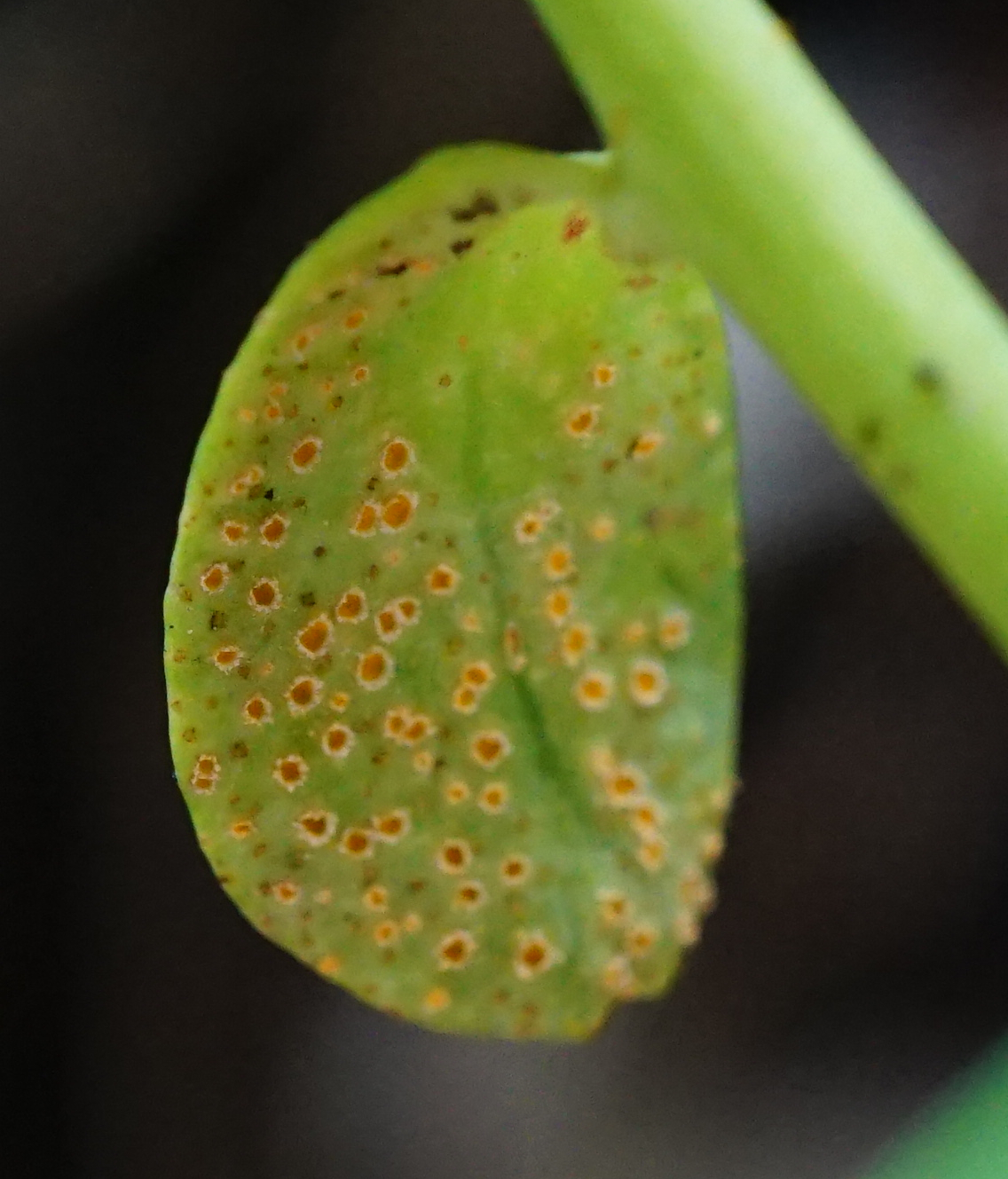
A rust-afflicted leaf by the fungus Endophyllum euphorbiae-sylvaticae

Plant diseases caused by fungi of the order Pucciniales.
2. A fungus of the Pucciniales.

== S ==
saprobe

An organism that uses dead organic material as food.
saxicolous
Growing on rocks (e.g. Lichenothelia).
scabrous
Rough.
scariose
Thin, papery.
sclerotium

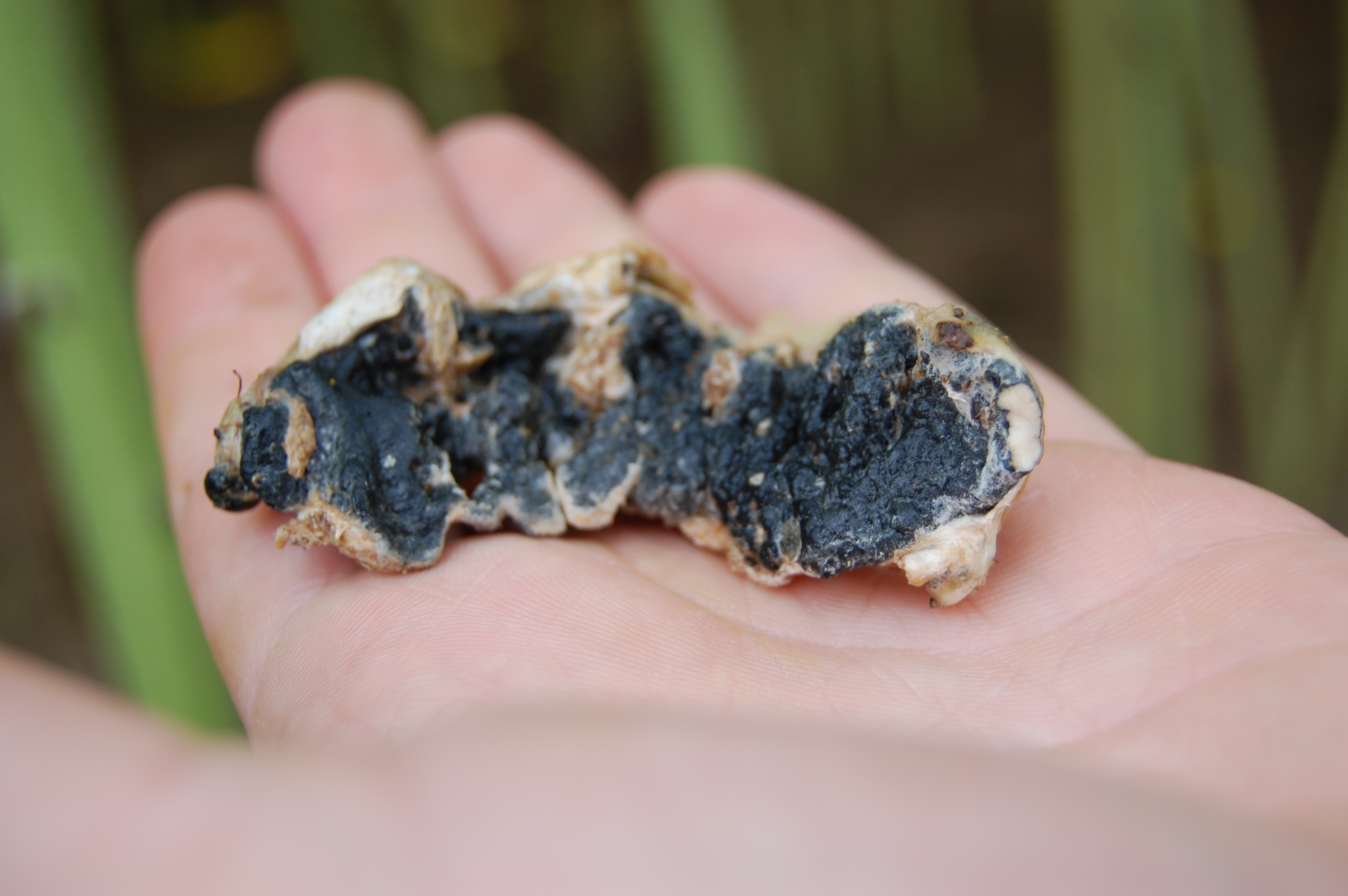
Sclerotinia sclerotiorum sclerotia

A hardened, often rounded, mass of hyphae, normally having no spores. May give rise to a fruit body, a stroma (as in ergot), conidiophores, or mycelium. Can be a store of nutrients as part of perennation; can reinitiate vegetative growth after conditions have improved and a season has passed.
scutate

Like a shield or round plate in shape. From Latin scutum, shield.
secotioid
A fruiting body with the appearance of an unopened agaric or bolete. The margin of the pileus does not break free of the columella-stipe, generally seen in vertical development (e.g. Podaxis pistillaris).
seminicolous
Living in seeds; seed-borne fungi. Examples include Ascochyta pisi, Colletotrichum lindemuthianum, Microdochium panattonianum, and others.
semimacronematous
Having a slightly morphologically different conidiophore from the vegetative hyphae.
senescence
1. Growing old. From Latin senescere, to grow old.
2. The degeneration over time that makes indefinite propagation of certain fungi cultures impossible, especially in isolation such as a lab environment.
septate
Having septa; divided by partitions.
septum

A cell wall in a hypha.
serrate
Edged with teeth, like a comb or saw, e.g. of gills; its diminutive form is serrulate.
sexual phase
The phase of the fungal life cycle when sexually reproductive cells and organs are formed. This term is preferred over sex in animals, as the fungal process is not equivalent.
slime mold

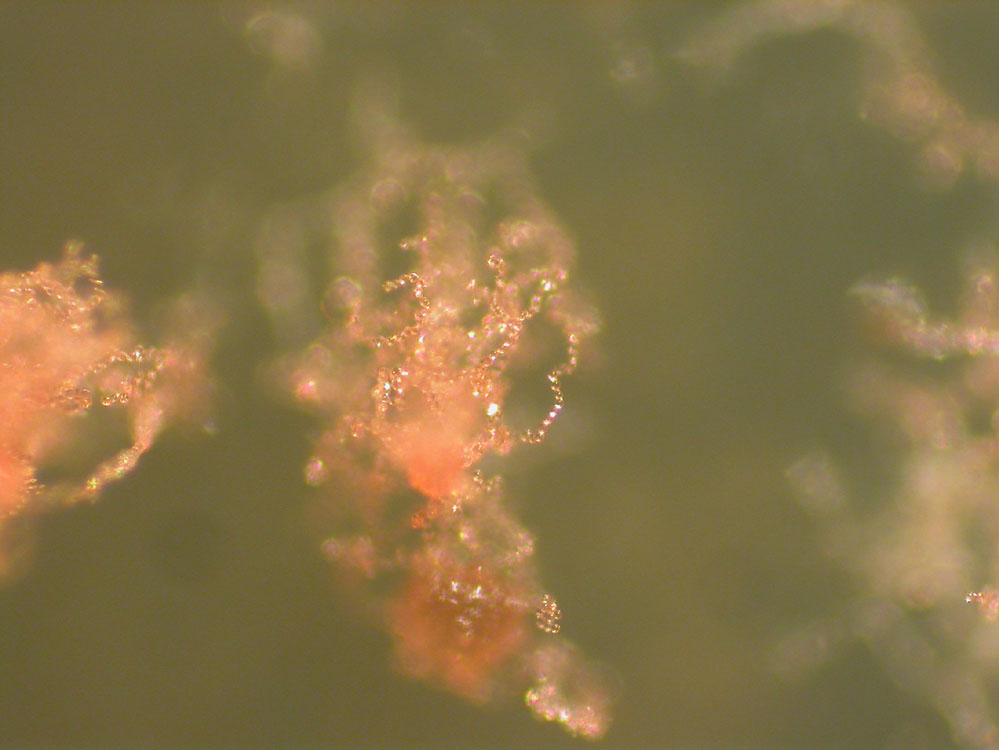
Acrasis rosea, a cellular slime mold

A eukaryotic lifeform that spreads via spores. Has both ameba (cellular slime molds) and plasmoidial (multi-nucleate) varieties. No longer categorized as fungi, but were formerly categorized as such in older literature. Cellular slime molds are part of Acrasiomycota or Dictyosteliomycota; plasmodial slime molds were traditionally part of the class Myxomycota, since renamed Myxogastria. From Gr. myxa, slime.
smut
1.

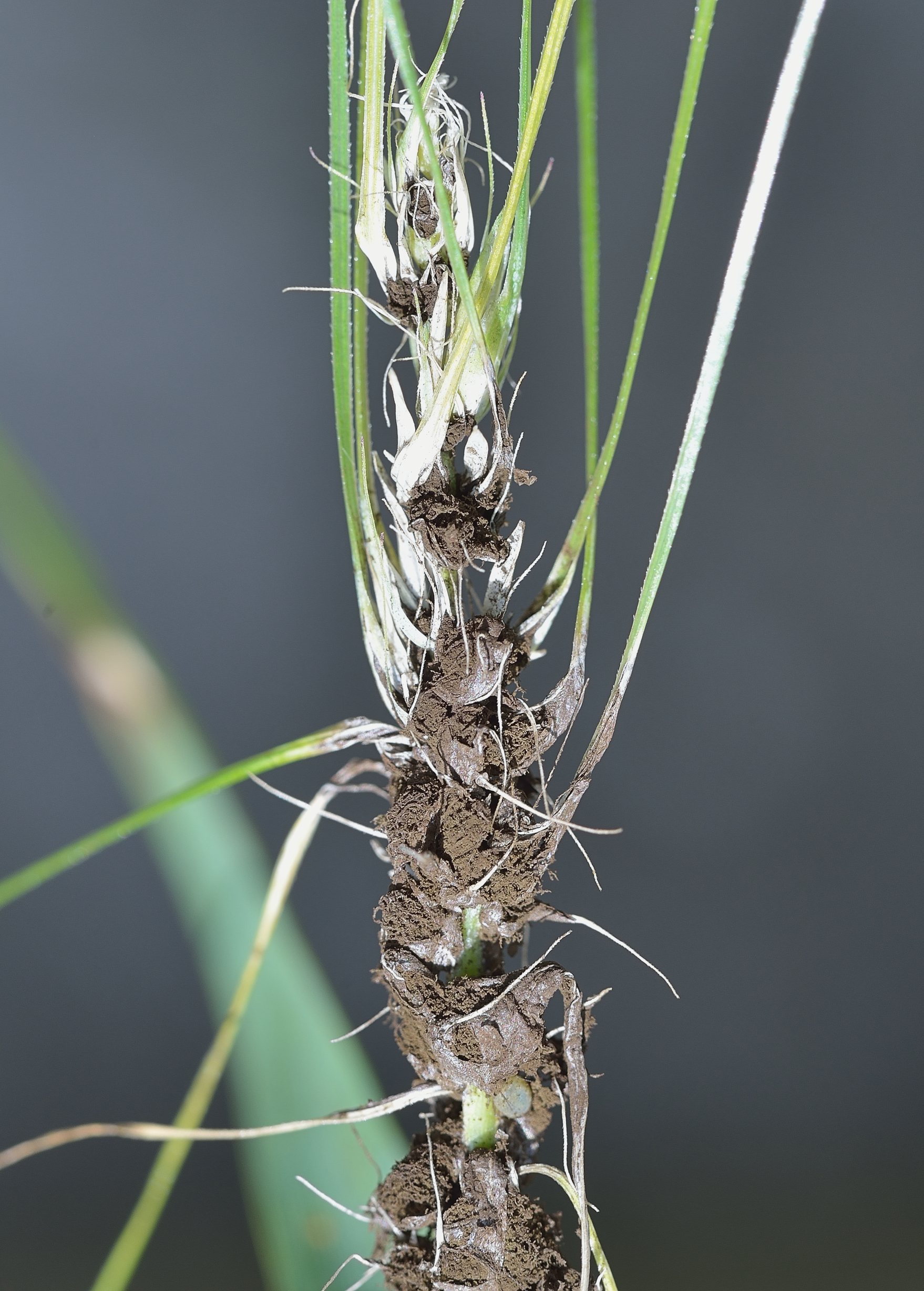
Loose smut of barley, caused by Ustilago nuda

A class of destructive plant diseases, generally of cereal grasses, caused by parasitic fungi of Ustilaginomycetes. Distinguished by transformation of plant organs permeated by hyphae into a dark mass of spores.
2. Smut-causing fungi themselves in Ustilaginomycetes. Characterized by being host-specific endophytes. Its spores are called ustilospores.
3. "False" smuts outside Ustilaginomycetes but that cause similar effects, such as Microbotryales and Exobasidiales.
soma

1. The assimilative (sustaining) body of an organism, distinguished from reproductive parts or phases. From Gr. soma, body.
2. Possibly the hallucinogenic Amanita muscaria mushroom in ancient Aryan religion; see botanical identity of soma–haoma.
somatogamy
The fusion of somatic (vegetative) cells during plasmogamy but not karyogamy. Found in the majority of basidiomycetes, many species of yeasts (such as Saccharomyces), and some chytrids (such as Chytriomyces).
soredium

A propagule for vegetative lichen growth; a combination of phycobiont algae wrapped by mycobiont hyphae, and produced on a lichen thallus. Has the appearance of a powdery granule. From Latin soredium, a small heap.
sorus

A heap of spores. Fruiting structure in certain fungi, including the spore mass of rusts, but also Acrasidae and Synchytriaceae. From Gr. soros, heap.
spawn
Mycelium used for starting fungal cultures, especially mushrooms; e.g. bricks of manure interlaced with mycelia.
spinose

Having spines.
spinulose
Having small, delicate spines (spinules).
Spitzenkörper

A vesicle-rich body surrounded by actin filaments found in the growing tips of most fungi during periods of growth. Densely staining.
spor-

Prefixes meaning "spore". From Gr. spora, seed.
sporangiolum

A small sporangium of Mucorales producing a small number of sporangiospores.
sporangiophore
A thallus element bearing one or more sporangia.
sporangiospore
A walled spore produced within a sporangium.
sporangium

A sac-like structure that produces spores endogenously. From Gr. angeion, vessel.
spore
A reproductive structure in fungi. Can result from both sexual and asexual processes.
spore wall
The layered wall defining a spore. Considered to have five layers. From within to outwards: the thin interior endosporium, the thick episporium, the exosporium (or tunic), the perisporium, and ectosporium, although the outermost two layers are fleeting and can be absorbed back into the perisporium and exosporium.
sporocarp

A unit for production, protection, and dissemination of spores. Sometimes divided into ascocarp, basidiocarp, and zyogosporocarp.
sporodochium
A cluster of conidiophores bearing the spore mass, like a cushion.
statismospore
A spore that is not forcibly discharged, unlike a ballistospore. Seen in the basidiospores of Gastromycetes. From Gr. statis, immobility.
stellate
Like a star in form, especially spores.
sterigma

The small, spicule-like (pointed) pedicel or structure upon which a basidiospore forms. From Gr. sterigma, support.
stipe
The stem or stalk of agarics, boletes, polypores, etc. From Latin stipes, trunk.
stolon
A horizontal hypha that sprouts where it touches the substrate, in Mucorales. Connects groups of rhizoids.
striate
Having minute radiating lines or ridges, such as the margin of a pileus.
stroma

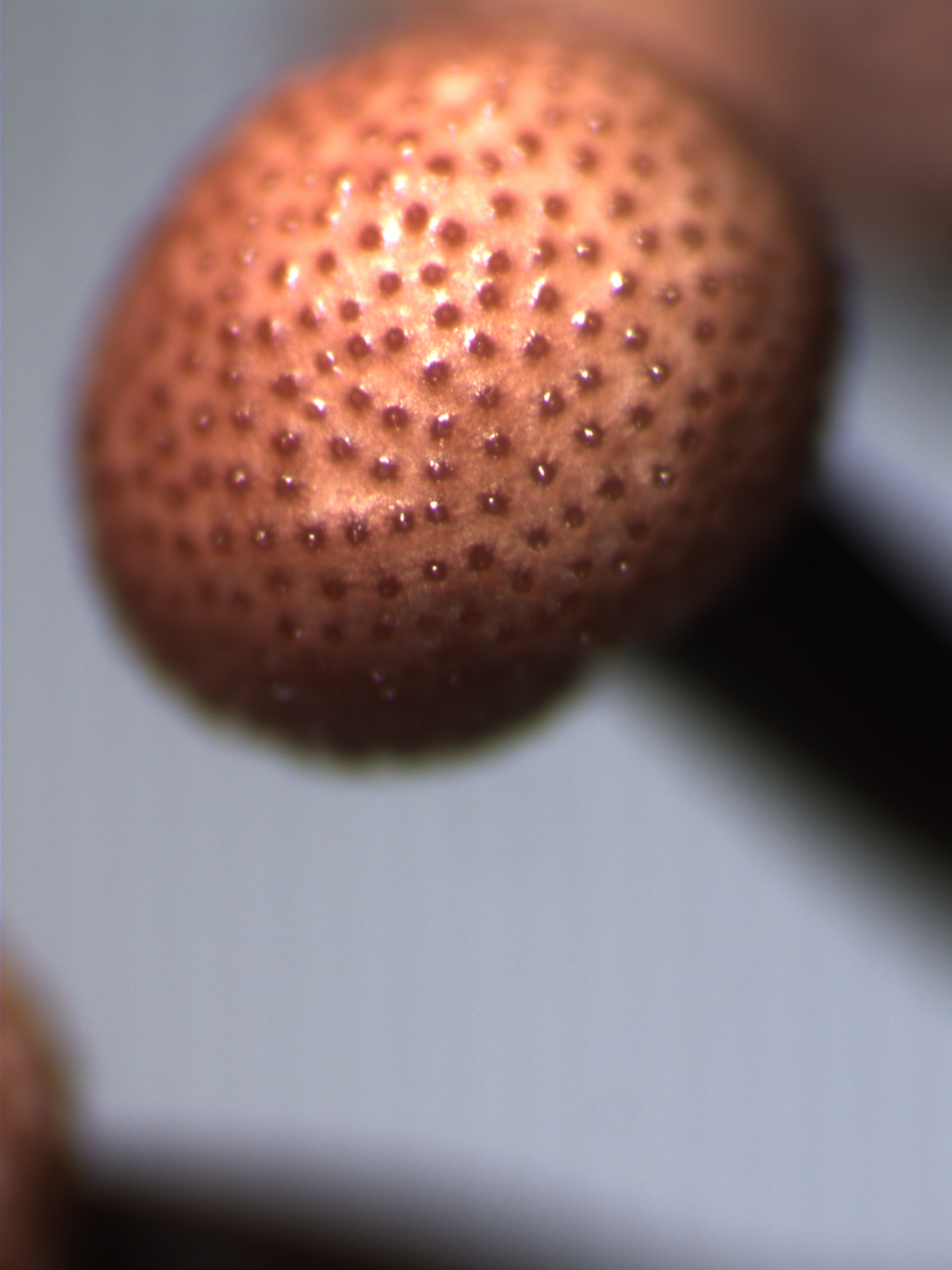
Close-up of a stroma of ergot, an ascomycete

A mass of vegetative hyphae where fertile hyphae, fruiting bodies, and spores are produced. Common among ascomycetes and anamorphic fungi; a few Pucciniales have them as well.
subglobose
Not quite spherical.
substrate
1. The substance on which an enzyme acts.
2. The substances used for growth, e.g. the culture medium in a lab.
3. A synonym for substratum.
substratum
The material on which the organism is growing or is attached; the ecology in the directly local sense.
sympodial
A mode of conidiogenous cell growth which results in the development of conidia on a geniculate or zig-zag rachis, due to repeated termination and branching. Examples include Cercospora and Helminthosporium.
synanamorph
Fungi which have multiple anamorph, or imperfect, phases.
synctium
A multinucleate structure resulting from the fusion of several uninucleate ameboid cells (myxameba), found in myxomycetes.
synnema

A bundle of erect and sometimes fused conidiophores that make a conidioma together. Conidia are born at the apex, and sometimes along the sides as well. Characteristic of certain asexual fungi including Doratomyces, Dendrostilbella, and Graphium.

== T ==
teleomorph

The sexual state (or perfect state) of a fungus whose spores are produced by meiosis, i.e. characterized by ascomata or basidiomata.
thallic
One of the two basic forms of conidiogenesis, with blastic conidiogenesis. Characterized by the conidia initial being delimited by one or more septa before it begins enlargement. The result is that the conidium is differentiated from the whole cell. By comparison, in blastic conidiogenesis, enlargement occurs within the cell before being delimited later.
thallus

1. The vegetative tissue of a thallophyte. Usually synonymous with mycelium in fungi. From Latin thallus, young branch.
2. A mode of conidial ontogeny where a conidium is formed from a pre-existing hyphal segment or cell.
torulose

Elongated in shape with swellings and constrictions at intervals. Found, e.g., in mycelia of Torula.
trama
1. A layer of hyphae in the central part of an agaric running from the underside of the cap to the lamella, often supporting the hymenium. Sometimes called a hymenophoral trama to distinguish it from the second definition.
2. In old literature, any fleshy part of the pileus, although this use has since been discouraged.
trehalose

A reserve sugar of fungi, especially yeasts and ergots, and lichens. Hydrolyzed by the enzyme trehalase.
tretic
A form of blastic conidiogenesis. Each conidium (tretoconidium, porospore) is delimited via the inner wall of the conidiogenous cell.
trichospore
A type of zygospore; a sporangia bearing a single spore. Usually coiled. Characteristic of the order Harpellales (formerly part of Trichomycetes).
troop
A group of fruit bodies from a single mycelium.
truffle

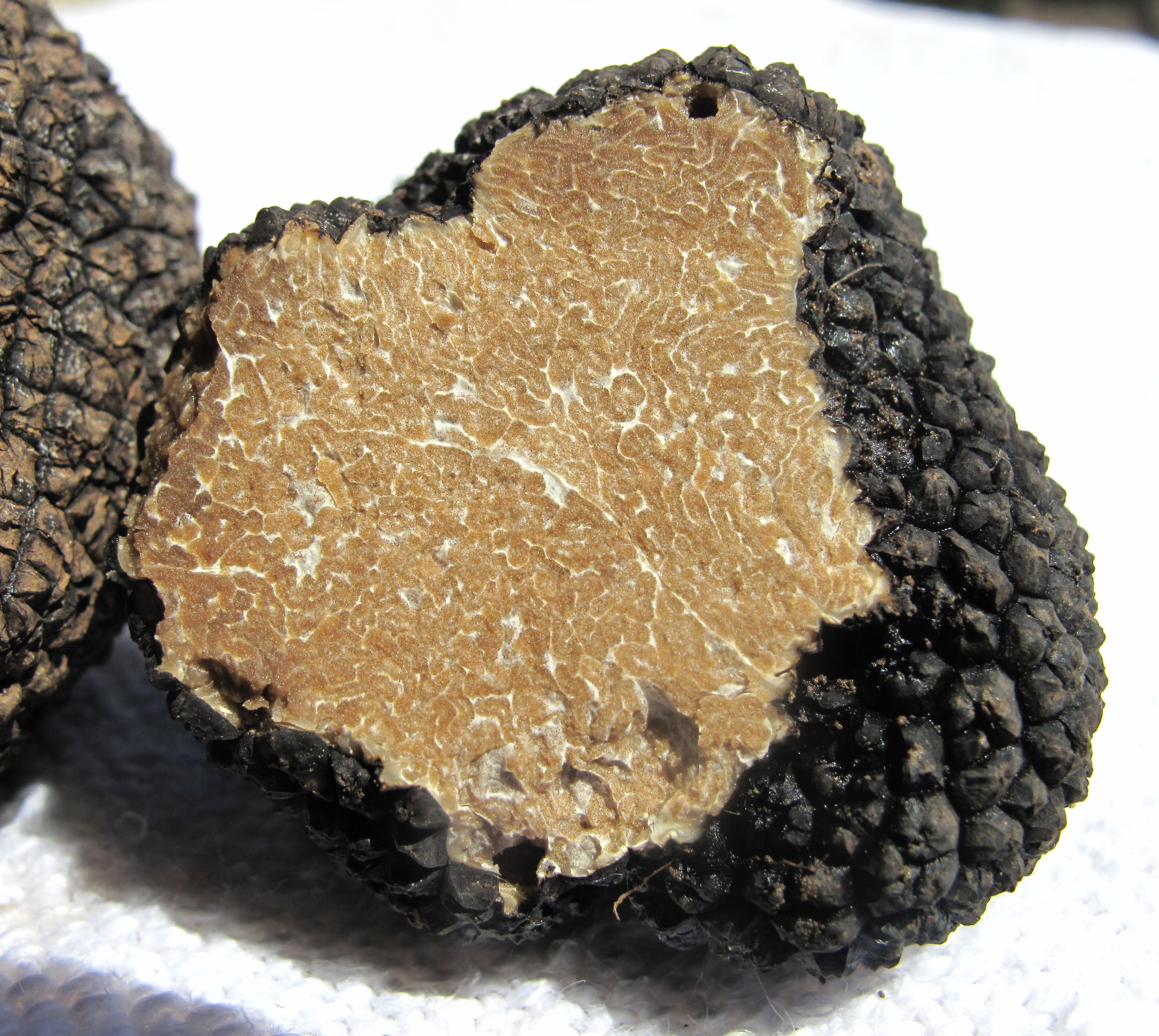
A cut Tuber aestivum or summer truffle

The edible, subterranean fruit (ascoma) of Tubers. Sometimes extended to "false truffles" as well such as Pezizales or Hymenogastrales.
truncate
Ending abruptly, as if cut off. From Latin truncare, to maim.
tubercle

A knob-like or wart-like excrescence.
tubercular

Having tubercles.
tumid
Swollen; inflated; e.g. of a stipe.
turgid
Tightly swollen, e.g. from hydrostatic pressure of endosmosed water. From Latin turgidus, distended.

== U ==
umbilicus
In some foliose lichens (e.g. Umbilicaria), the central, strongly attaching organ of the thallus.
uniseriate
Arranged in a single row or series. Generally used to differentiate how phialides are arranged in species of Aspergillus; in uniseriate, they are directly on the conidial head, contrasted with biseriate where phialides rest on intermediate outgrowths of sterile cells called metulae.
universal veil

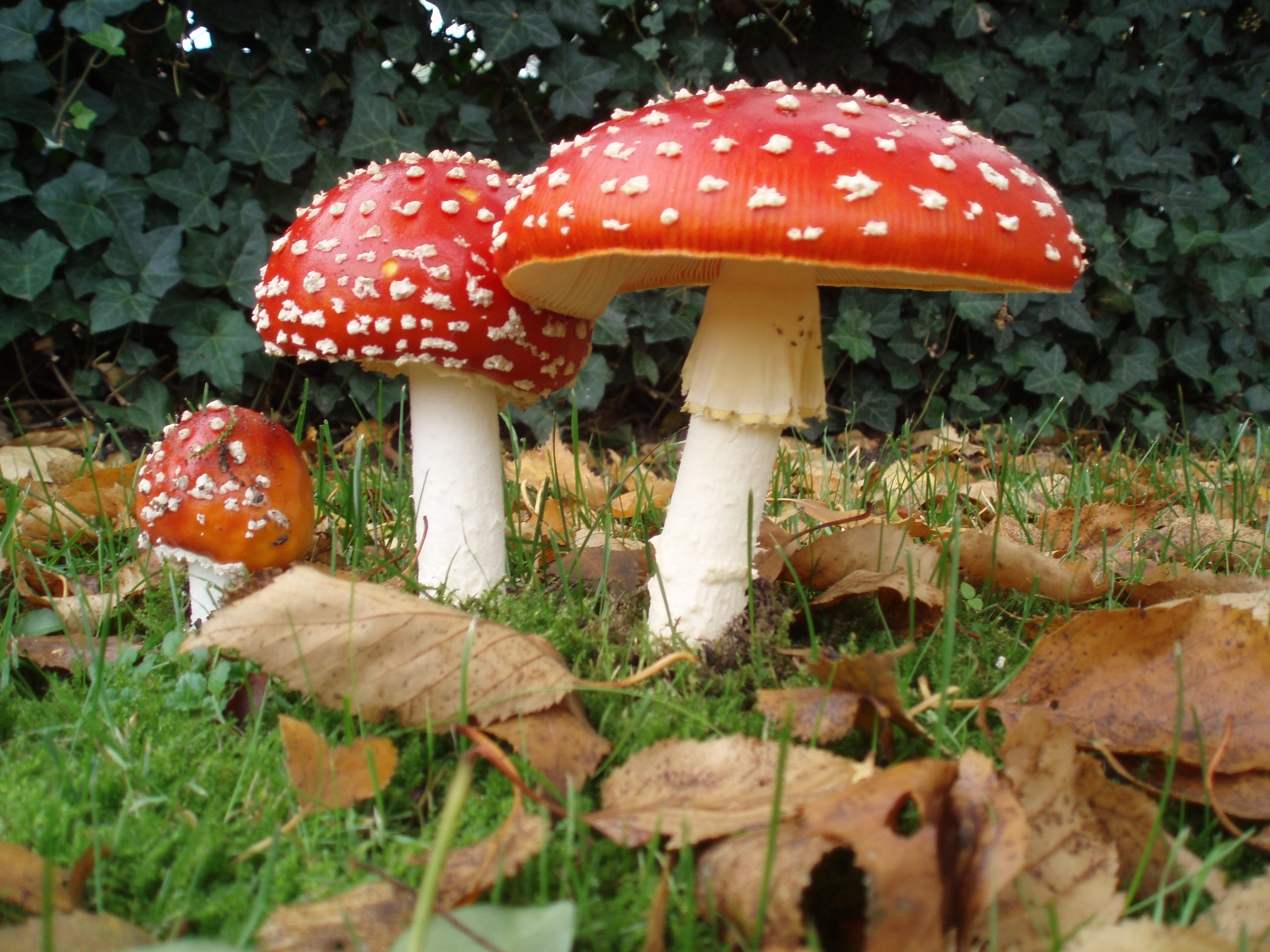
The white patches on the caps of these Amanita muscaria mushrooms are cap scales, remnants of the universal veil.

A layer of tissue covering the basidioma during its early development, in agarics and Gasteromycetes. As the pileus grows, the veil is broken, with its upper remnants becoming cap scales, and the lower section becoming the volva.
ustilospore
The spore of a smut fungus.

== V ==
verrucose
Warty; having rounded bumps. Verruculose is the diminutive version for delicate or small warts.
verticillate
Having parts in rings (verticils); whorled. Develops due to branching in which branches or pedicels are borne at the same level on the hypha, and grow obliquely upward with respect to the central axis. Named after the conidiophores of Verticillium, but appears in other fungi such as the sporangiophore of Actinomucor. From New Latin verticillatus, arranged in a verticil.
vesicle
1. A bladder-like sac, especially of Peronosporales where zoospores mature.
2. The swollen apex of the conidiophore of Aspergillus
3. The subsporangial swelling in species of Pilobolus.
virgate
Banded or streaked. Generally applied to the surface of the pileus of a basidiocarp. From Latin virga, a twig, wand, rod, stripe, or streak.
volva
The cup-like remnant of the universal veil at the base of the stipe in the basidiocarp of agarics and Gasteromycetes. Generally beneath the soil as a result, hidden from view unless the fungus is uprooted.

== W ==
wart disease

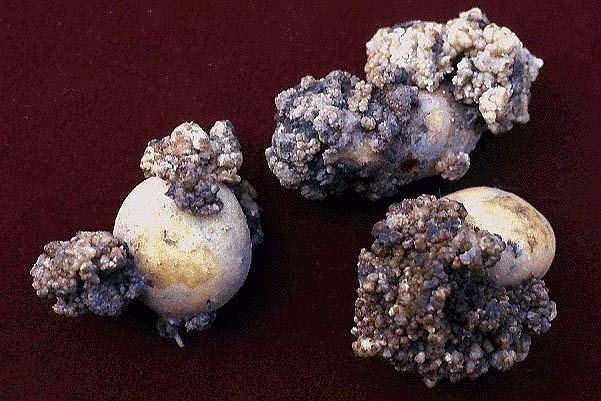
Synchytrium endobioticum on potatoes

A fungal disease of the potato caused by Synchytrium endobioticum, a chytrid.
witches' brooms
Massed outgrowths on branches of woody plants caused by mites, viruses, and/or fungi, especially rust-causing fungi.
witches' butter
Basidioma of Exidia glandulosa (or, in America, Tremella lutescens). Supposedly effective in witchcraft when thrown into a fire.
wood-decay fungus

Fungi that digest wood. Mostly basidiomycetes, although a few ascomycetes also possess this ability. Generally categorized into brown rot, which digests a tree's cellulose and hemicellulose but not its lignin; white rot, which can also digest lignin; and soft rots, which are similar to brown rots in attacking cellulose and hemicellulose, but require moist wood and available nitrogen, e.g. from nearby soil. Two other notable types are dry rot (a slight misnomer, as some dampness is still required), a brown rot caused by Serpula lacrimans; and wet rot, several other species including cellar fungus.

== X ==
xerophilic
Preferring a dry habitat, or at least capable of subsisting in one. Rare among fungal species, but fungi with this capability can be exceptionally common, such as Aspergillus and Penicillium whose spores can be found in nearly any soil sample.

== Y ==
yeast

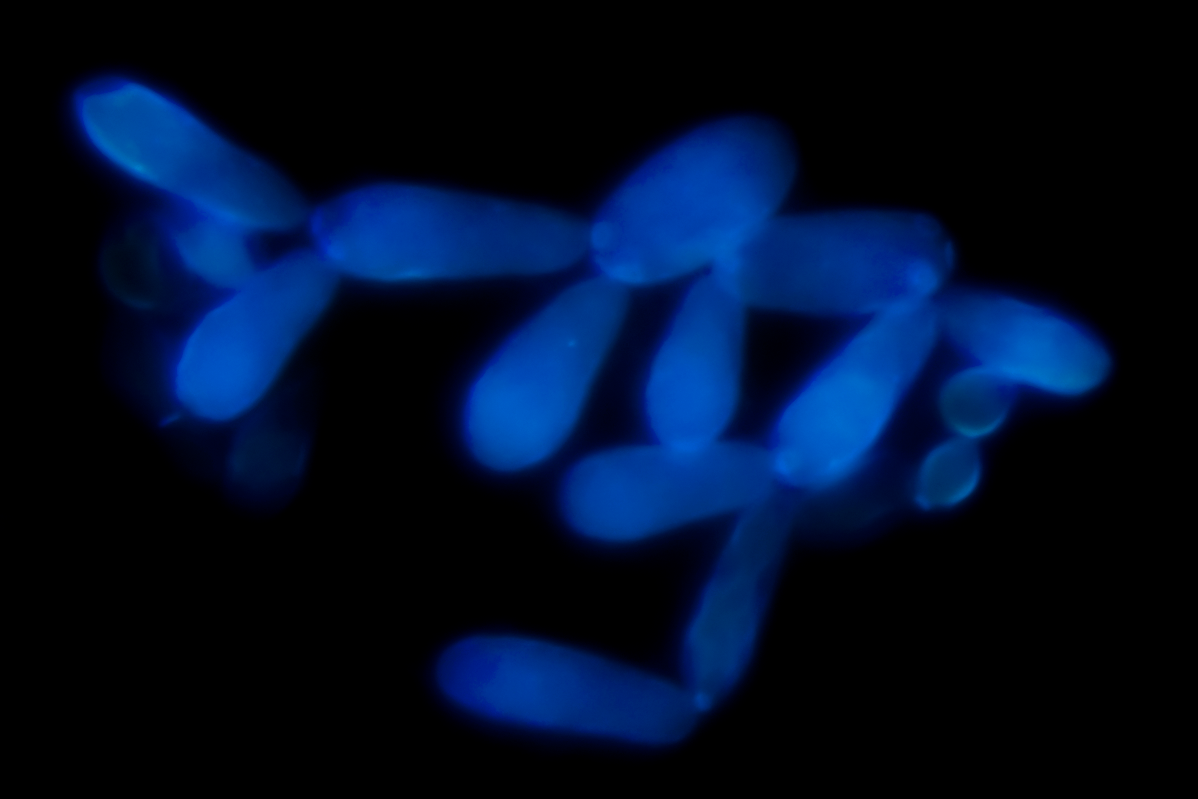
Yeast cells under magnification from kombucha, a fermented sweet tea drink

Unicellular, budding fungi. Not a formal taxonomic unit; a cross-phyla grouping of filamentous fungi. Classifications include sporogenous yeasts, asporogenous yeasts, apiculate yeasts, baker's yeast, brewer's yeast and beer yeasts, black yeasts, bottom yeasts, top yeasts, Chinese yeasts, flor yeasts, food yeasts, petite yeasts, shadow yeasts, springer yeasts, toddy yeasts, and wine yeasts. From Old High German jesan, ferment.
yellow rice
Rice discolored and contaminated by Penicillium fungi.
yellows
Various fungal diseases of plants causing yellowing, most notably cabbage (Fusarium oxysporum). See also yellow rice.

== Z ==
Zoopagomycotina
A subdivision of Zygomycota broken off into a separate classification in the 2010s. Typically microscopic and obligate parasites.
zoospore

A motile sporangiospore, i.e. having flagella.
Zygomycota

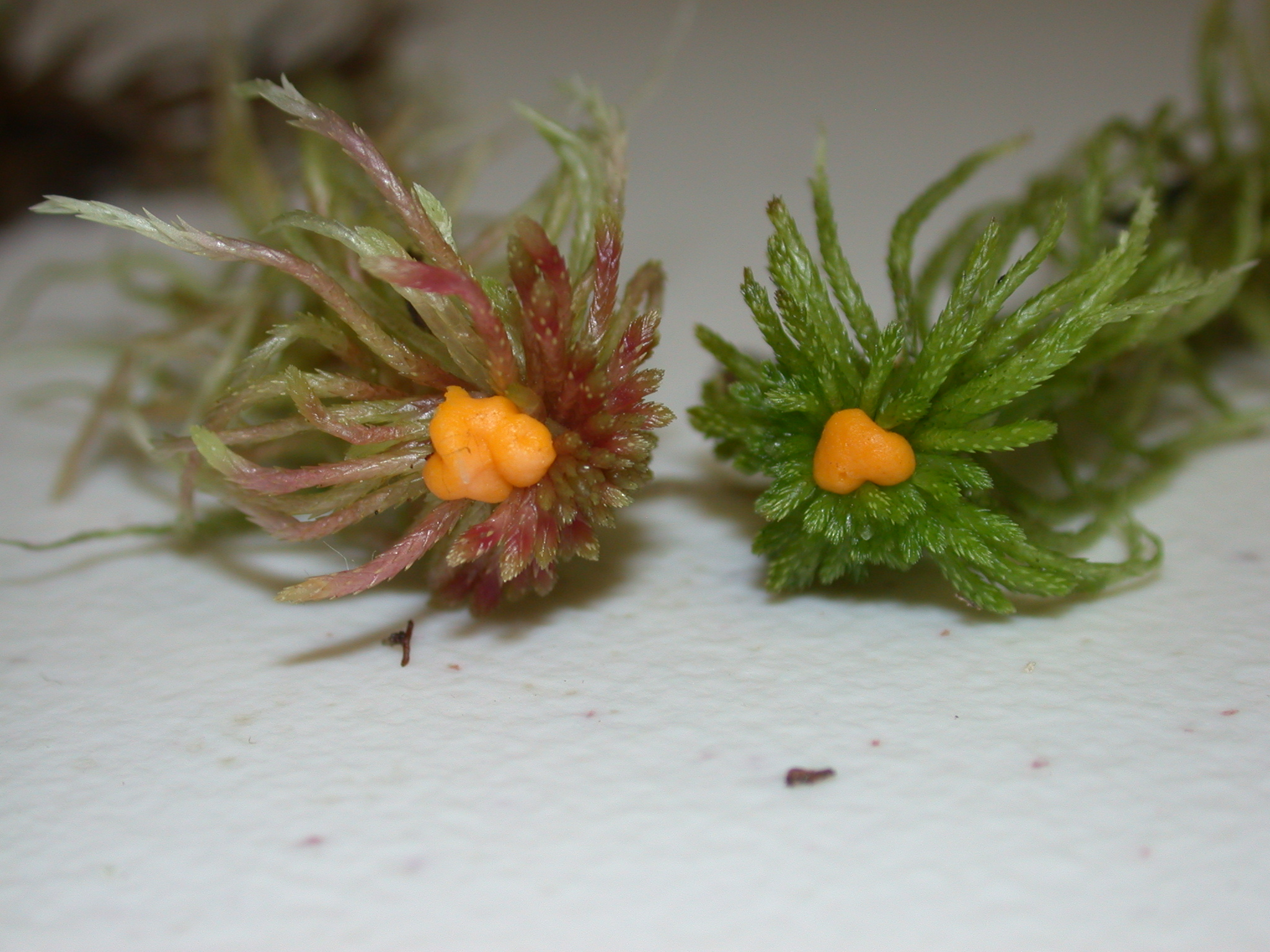
The Zygomycete Endogone pisiformus growing on sphagnum in a wet area

A traditional major phylum of fungi; characterized by coenocytic mycelia. Divided into Mucoromycota and Zoopagomycota in 2016. Frequently saprobes or parasites of arthropods.
zygospore
A thick-walled sexual spore formed by the fusion of two similar gametangia; characteristic of the Zygomycetes.
zygote
A cell resulting from the fusion of two gametes of opposite sex.
zymo-
Prefix meaning "yeast". From Gr. zymos, yeast.
zymogenous
Ferment-producing.
zymology

The practice and study of yeasts and fermentation in brewing and wine-making.

== See also ==
- List of mycologists
- Outline of fungi
  - Outline of lichens
- Glossary of lichen terms
