= Cellular compartment =

Closed part in cytosol

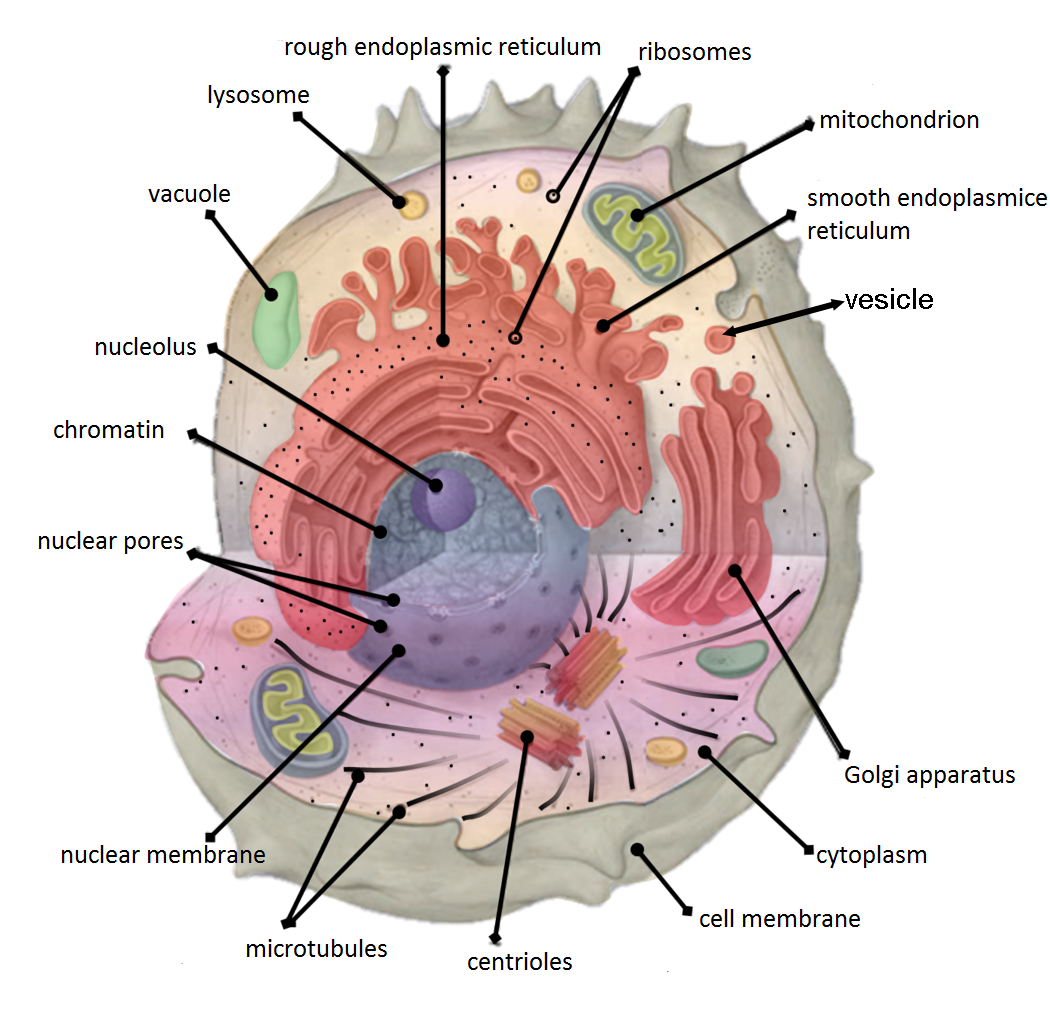
Basic cellular compartments

Cellular compartments in cell biology comprise all of the closed parts within the cytosol of a eukaryotic cell, usually surrounded by a single or double lipid layer membrane. These compartments are often, but not always, defined as membrane-enclosed organelles. The formation of cellular compartments is called compartmentalization.

Both organelles, the mitochondria and chloroplasts (in photosynthetic organisms), are compartments that are believed to be of endosymbiotic origin. Other compartments such as peroxisomes, lysosomes, the endoplasmic reticulum, the cell nucleus or the Golgi apparatus are not of endosymbiotic origin. Smaller elements like vesicles, and sometimes even microtubules can also be counted as compartments.

It was thought that compartmentalization is not found in prokaryotic cells., but the discovery of carboxysomes and many other metabolosomes revealed that prokaryotic cells are capable of making compartmentalized structures, albeit these are in most cases not surrounded by a lipid bilayer, but of pure proteinaceous built.

== Types ==
In general, there are 4 main cellular compartments, they are:

1. The nuclear compartment comprising the nucleus
2. The intercisternal space which comprises the space between the membranes of the endoplasmic reticulum (which is continuous with the nuclear envelope)
3. Organelles (the mitochondrion in all eukaryotes and the plastid in phototrophic eukaryotes)
4. The cytosol

== Function ==
Compartments have three main roles. One is to establish physical boundaries for biological processes that enables the cell to carry out different metabolic activities at the same time. This may include keeping certain biomolecules within a region, or keeping other molecules outside. Within the membrane-bound compartments, different intracellular pH, different enzyme systems, and other differences are isolated from other organelles and cytosol. With mitochondria, the cytosol has an oxidizing environment which converts NADH to NAD+. With these cases, the compartmentalization is physical.

Another is to generate a specific micro-environment to spatially or temporally regulate a biological process. As an example, a yeast vacuole is normally acidified by proton transporters on the membrane.

A third role is to establish specific locations or cellular addresses for which processes should occur. For example, a transcription factor may be directed to a nucleus, where it can promote transcription of certain genes. In terms of protein synthesis, the necessary organelles are relatively near one another. The nucleolus within the nuclear envelope is the location of ribosome synthesis. The destination of synthesized ribosomes for protein translation is rough endoplasmic reticulum (rough ER), which is connected to and shares the same membrane with the nucleus. The Golgi body is also near the rough ER for packaging and redistributing. Likewise, intracellular compartmentalization allows specific sites of related eukaryotic cell functions isolated from other processes and therefore efficient.

== Establishment ==
Often, cellular compartments are defined by membrane enclosure. These membranes provide physical barriers to biomolecules. Transport across these barriers is often controlled in order to maintain the optimal concentration of biomolecules within and outside of the compartment.

== Emergence of the eukaryotic nucleus ==
The eukaryotic cell is thought to have arisen when an ancestral archaeal cell internalized an aerobic bacterium (the proto-mitochondrion). Mans et al. proposed that the evolutionary development of the eukaryotic cell nucleus was triggered by this archaeo-bacterial symbiosis. The nuclear envelope (membrane), a defining characteristic of the eukaryotic cell, was suggested to have arisen as an adaptation for segregating the original archaeal host DNA genome away from the proto-mitochondria, the main source of damaging reactive oxygen species.
