= Prokaryote =

- Diagram of a prokaryotic cell, a bacterium with a flagellum

Scientific classification

Groups included
- Bacteria; Archaea

Cladistically included but traditionally excluded taxa
- Eukaryota

Unicellular organism lacking a membrane-bound nucleus

A prokaryote (/proʊˈkærioʊt, -ət/; from Ancient Greek πρό pró, meaning 'before'; and κάρυον káruon, meaning 'nut' or 'kernel'), less commonly spelled procaryote, is a cellular organism that lacks a distinct cell nucleus or other membrane-bound organelles. In the earlier two-empire system, prokaryotes formed the empire Prokaryota; in the current three-domain system, based upon molecular phylogenetics, prokaryotes are divided into two domains, Bacteria and Archaea. A third domain, Eukaryota, which consists of single- and multi-cellular organisms with nuclei, organelles and complex cellular architecture, is sometimes considered a clade under Archaea in the two-domain system.

All prokaryotes are single-celled microorganisms that reproduce asexually via binary fission, although horizontal gene transfer is also common. Some prokaryotes such as cyanobacteria form colonies held together by biofilms, and large microbial communities formed by symbiotic colonies of different prokaryote groups can create multilayered microbial mats, which can become mineralized and geologically preserved in the fossil records as stromatolites. Prokaryotes are important biodegraders and primary producers of the aquatic and terrestrial ecosystems, and play a crucial part in the Earth's carbon, nitrogen, phosphorus and oxygen cycles.

Prokaryotes are among the earliest known life forms on Earth, having evolved from pre-cellular first universal common ancestor (FUCA) with a notable diversification around 3.72–4.18 Ga, and the last universal common ancestor (LUCA, who is considered "prokaryote-grade") evolved around 4.09–4.33 Ga. Molecular phylogenetics has provided insight into the interrelationships of the three domains of life. The division between prokaryotes and eukaryotes reflects two very different levels of cellular organization; only eukaryotic cells have a membrane-enclosed nucleus that contains their DNA, and other membrane-bound organelles including mitochondria (which evolved from prokaryotic endosymbionts through an evolutionary process known as symbiogenesis). More recently, the primary division has been seen as that between Archaea and Bacteria, since eukaryotes may be part of the archaean clade and have multiple homologies with other Archaea.

== Structure ==
The cellular components of prokaryotes are not enclosed in membranes within the cytoplasm, like eukaryotic organelles. Bacteria have microcompartments, quasi-organelles enclosed in protein shells such as encapsulin protein cages, while both bacteria and some archaea have gas vesicles.

Prokaryotes have simple cell skeletons. These are highly diverse, and contain homologues of the eukaryote proteins actin and tubulin. The cytoskeleton provides the capability for movement within the cell.

Most prokaryotes are between 1 and 10 μm, but they vary in size from 0.2 μm in Thermodiscus spp. and Mycoplasma genitalium to 750 μm in Thiomargarita namibiensis.

Bacterial cells have various shapes, including spherical or ovoid cocci, e.g., Streptococcus; cylindrical bacilli, e.g., Lactobacillus; spiral bacteria, e.g., Helicobacter; or comma-shaped, e.g., Vibrio. Archaea are mainly simple ovoids, but Haloquadratum is flat and square.

Parts of the prokaryote cell
Element	Description
Flagellum (not always present)	Long, whip-like protrusion that moves the cell.
Cell membrane	Surrounds the cell's cytoplasm, regulates flow of substances in and out.
Cell wall (except in Mollicutes, Thermoplasma)	Outer covering that protects the cell and gives it shape.
Cytoplasm	A watery gel that contains enzymes, salts, and organic molecules.
Ribosome	Structure that produces proteins as specified by DNA.
Nucleoid	Region that contains the prokaryote's single DNA molecule.
Capsule (only in some groups)	Glycoprotein covering outside the cell membrane.

== Reproduction and DNA transfer ==
Bacteria and archaea reproduce through asexual reproduction, usually by binary fission. Genetic exchange and recombination occur by horizontal gene transfer, not involving replication. DNA transfer between prokaryotic cells occurs in bacteria and archaea.

In bacteria, gene transfer occurs by three processes. These are virus-mediated transduction; conjugation; and natural transformation.

Transduction of bacterial genes by bacteriophage viruses appears to reflect occasional errors during intracellular assembly of virus particles, rather than an adaptation of the host bacteria. There are at least three ways that it can occur, all involving the incorporation of some bacterial DNA in the virus, and from there to another bacterium.

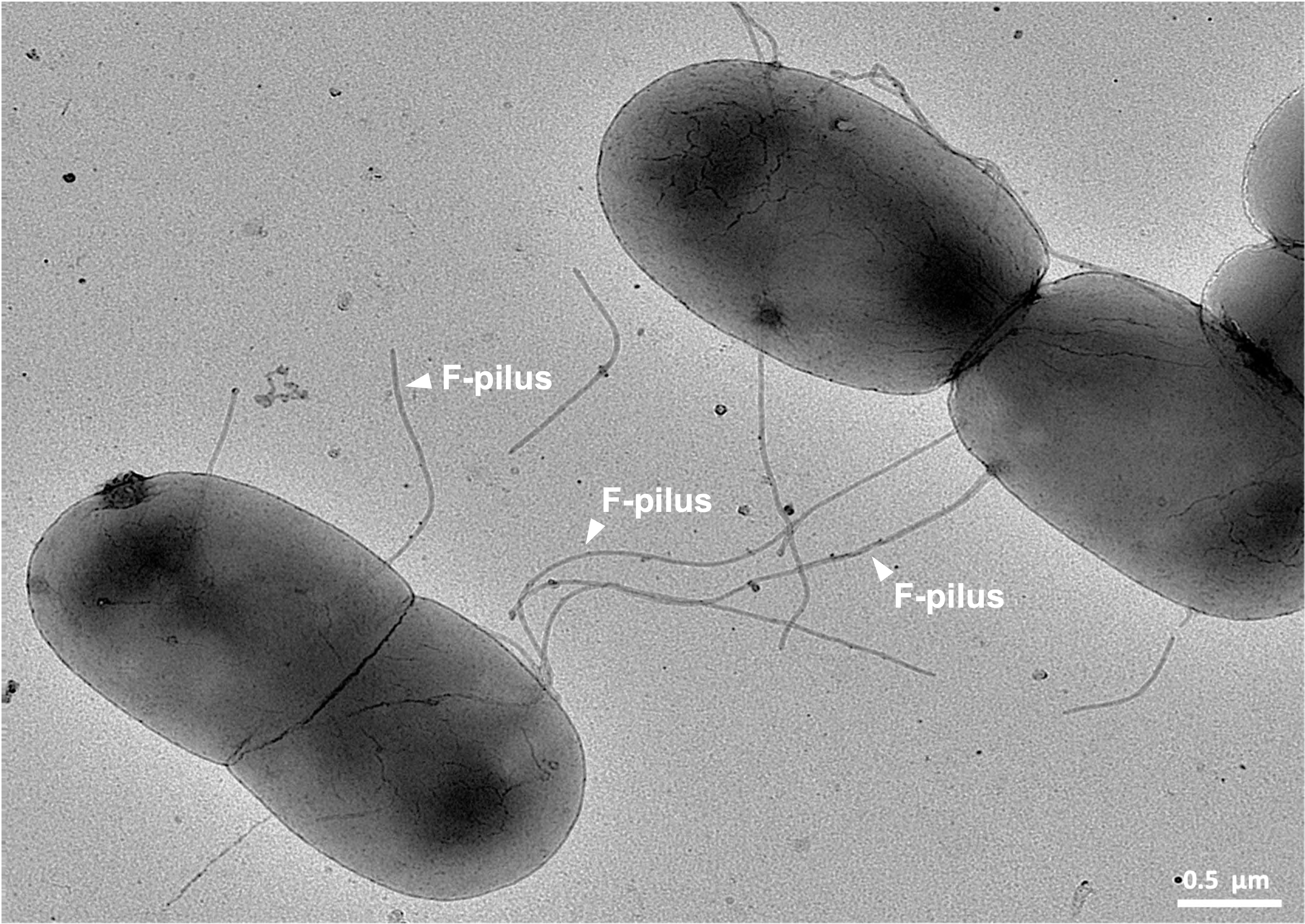
Bacterial conjugation using F-pili to exchange DNA

Conjugation involves plasmids, allowing plasmid DNA to be transferred from one bacterium to another. Infrequently, a plasmid may integrate into the host bacterial chromosome, and subsequently transfer part of the host bacterial DNA to another bacterium.

Natural bacterial transformation involves the transfer of DNA from one bacterium to another through the water around them. This is a bacterial adaptation for DNA transfer, because it depends on the interaction of numerous bacterial gene products.

The bacterium must first enter the physiological state called competence; in Bacillus subtilis, the process involves 40 genes. The amount of DNA transferred during transformation can be as much as a third of the whole chromosome. Transformation is common, occurring in at least 67 species of bacteria.

Among archaea, Haloferax volcanii forms cytoplasmic bridges between cells that transfer DNA between cells, while Sulfolobus solfataricus transfers DNA between cells by direct contact. Exposure of S. solfataricus to agents that damage DNA induces cellular aggregation, perhaps enhancing homologous recombination to increase the repair of damaged DNA.

== Colonies and biofilms ==
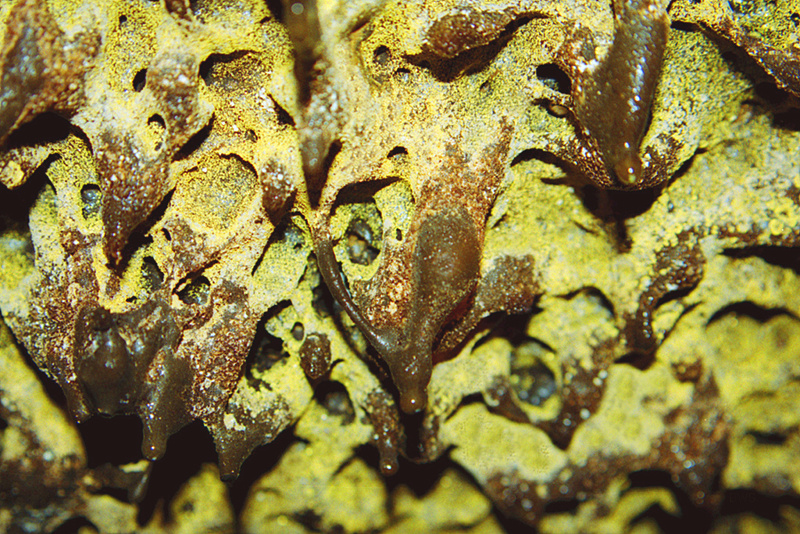
Biofilm of golden hydrophobic bacteria in a cave

Prokaryotes are strictly unicellular, but most can form stable aggregate communities in biofilms. Bacterial biofilms are formed by the secretion of extracellular polymeric substance (EPS). Myxobacteria have multicellular stages in their life cycles. Biofilms may be structurally complex and may attach to solid surfaces, or exist at liquid-air interfaces. Bacterial biofilms are often made up of microcolonies (dome-shaped masses of bacteria and matrix) separated by channels through which water may flow easily. Microcolonies may join above the substratum to form a continuous layer. This structure functions as a simple circulatory system by moving water through the biofilm, helping to provide cells with oxygen which is often in short supply. The result approaches a multicellular organisation. Differential cell expression, collective behavior, signaling (quorum sensing), programmed cell death, and discrete biological dispersal events all seem to point in this direction. Bacterial biofilms may be 100 times more resistant to antibiotics than free-living unicells, making them difficult to remove from surfaces they have colonized.

== Environment ==
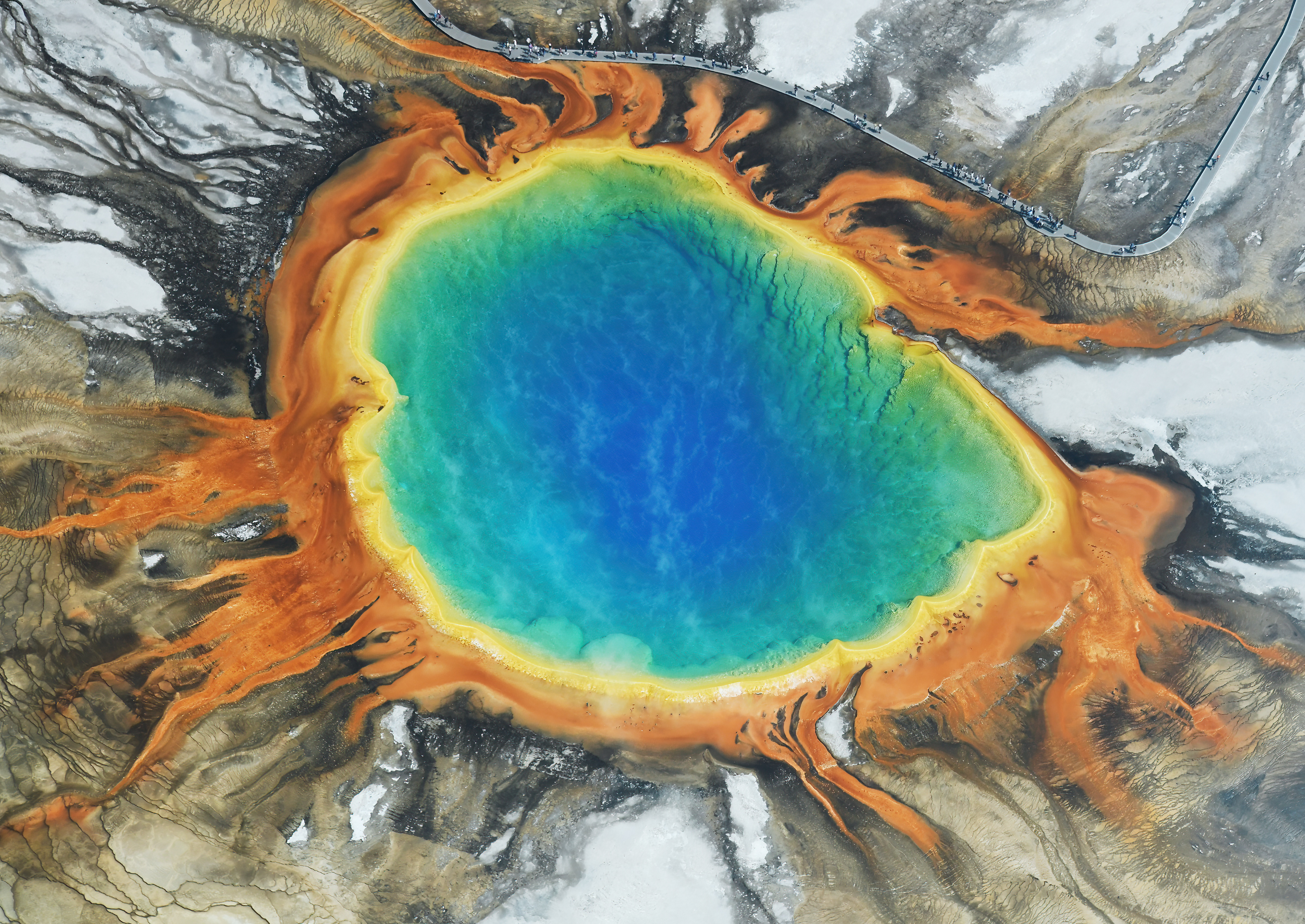
The bright colors of Grand Prismatic Spring, Yellowstone National Park are produced by thermophilic bacteria.

Prokaryotes have diversified greatly throughout their long existence. Their metabolism is far more varied than that of eukaryotes, leading to many highly distinct types. For example, prokaryotes may obtain energy by chemosynthesis. Prokaryotes live nearly everywhere on Earth, including in environments as cold as soils in Antarctica, or as hot as undersea hydrothermal vents and land-based hot springs. Some bacteria are pathogenic, causing disease in organisms including humans. Some archaea and bacteria are extremophiles, thriving in harsh conditions, such as high temperatures (thermophiles) or high salinity (halophiles). Some archaeans are methanogens, living in anoxic environments and releasing methane. Many archaea grow as plankton in the oceans. Symbiotic prokaryotes live in or on the bodies of other organisms, including humans. Prokaryotes have high populations in the soil, in the sea, and in undersea sediments. Soil prokaryotes are still heavily undercharacterized despite their easy proximity to humans and their tremendous economic importance to agriculture.

== The first organisms ==
In the theory of symbiogenesis, a merger of two prokaryotes, an archaean and an aerobic bacterium, created the eukaryotes, with aerobic mitochondria; a second merger added chloroplasts from a third prokaryote, a photosynthetic cyanobacterium, creating the green plants.

A widespread model of the origin of life is that the first organisms were prokaryotes. These developed from protocells, while the eukaryotes arose later in the history of life, by symbiogenesis: a merger of two prokaryotes, an archaean and an aerobic bacterium, created the first eukaryote, with aerobic mitochondria. A second merger added chloroplasts, from a photosynthetic cyanobacterium, creating the green plants.

The oldest fossilized prokaryotes were laid down approximately 3.5 billion years ago, only about 1 billion years after the formation of the Earth's crust. Eukaryotes only appear in the fossil record later. The oldest fossil eukaryotes are about 1.7 billion years old.

Some recent studies suggest that prokaryotes might be polyphyletic.

== Evolution ==
=== Taxonomy and phylogeny ===
The distinction between prokaryotes and eukaryotes was established by the microbiologists Roger Stanier and C. B. van Niel in their 1962 paper The concept of a bacterium (though spelled procaryote and eucaryote there). That paper cites Édouard Chatton's 1937 book Titres et Travaux Scientifiques for using those terms and recognizing the distinction. One reason for this classification was so that the group then often called blue-green algae (now cyanobacteria) would not be classified as plants but grouped with bacteria.

In 1977, Carl Woese proposed dividing prokaryotes into the Bacteria and Archaea (originally Eubacteria and Archaebacteria) because of the major differences in the structure and genetics between the two groups of organisms. Archaea were originally thought to be extremophiles, living only in inhospitable conditions such as extremes of temperature, pH, and radiation but have since been found in all types of habitats. The resulting arrangement of Eukaryota (also called "Eucarya"), Bacteria, and Archaea is called the three-domain system, replacing the traditional two-empire system.

Knowledge of prokaryote taxonomy is rapidly changing in the 21st century with the sequencing of large numbers of genomes, many of these without the isolation of cultures of the organisms involved. As of 2021, consensus had not been reached among taxonomists to rely exclusively on genomes as opposed to existing practices, describing species from cultures.

According to the 2016 phylogenetic analysis of Laura Hug and colleagues, using genomic data on over 1,000 organisms, the relationships among prokaryotes are as shown in the tree diagram. Bacteria dominate the diversity of organisms, shown at left, top, and right in the diagram; the archaea are shown bottom centre, and the eukaryotes in the small green area at bottom right. As represented by red dots on the diagram, there are multiple major lineages where no representative has been isolated: such lineages are common in both bacteria (such as Omnitrophica and Wirthbacteria) and archaea (such as Parvarchaeota and Lokiarchaeota). At the lower levels (species to class) and up to the level of phylum, the data provide strong support for the groupings, but the deepest (oldest) branches of the phylogeny are more uncertain.

The large diversity of bacterial lineages shown in purple on the right of the diagram represent the so-called "candidate phyla radiation of bacteria", namely those with a combination of small genomes and reduced metabolic capabilities: none of them have been found to be able to carry out the whole of the citric acid cycle by which many cells release usable energy, and few can synthesise amino acids and nucleotides, building blocks of proteins and nucleic acids. This may represent an ancient condition, or a loss of capabilities of symbiotic organisms.

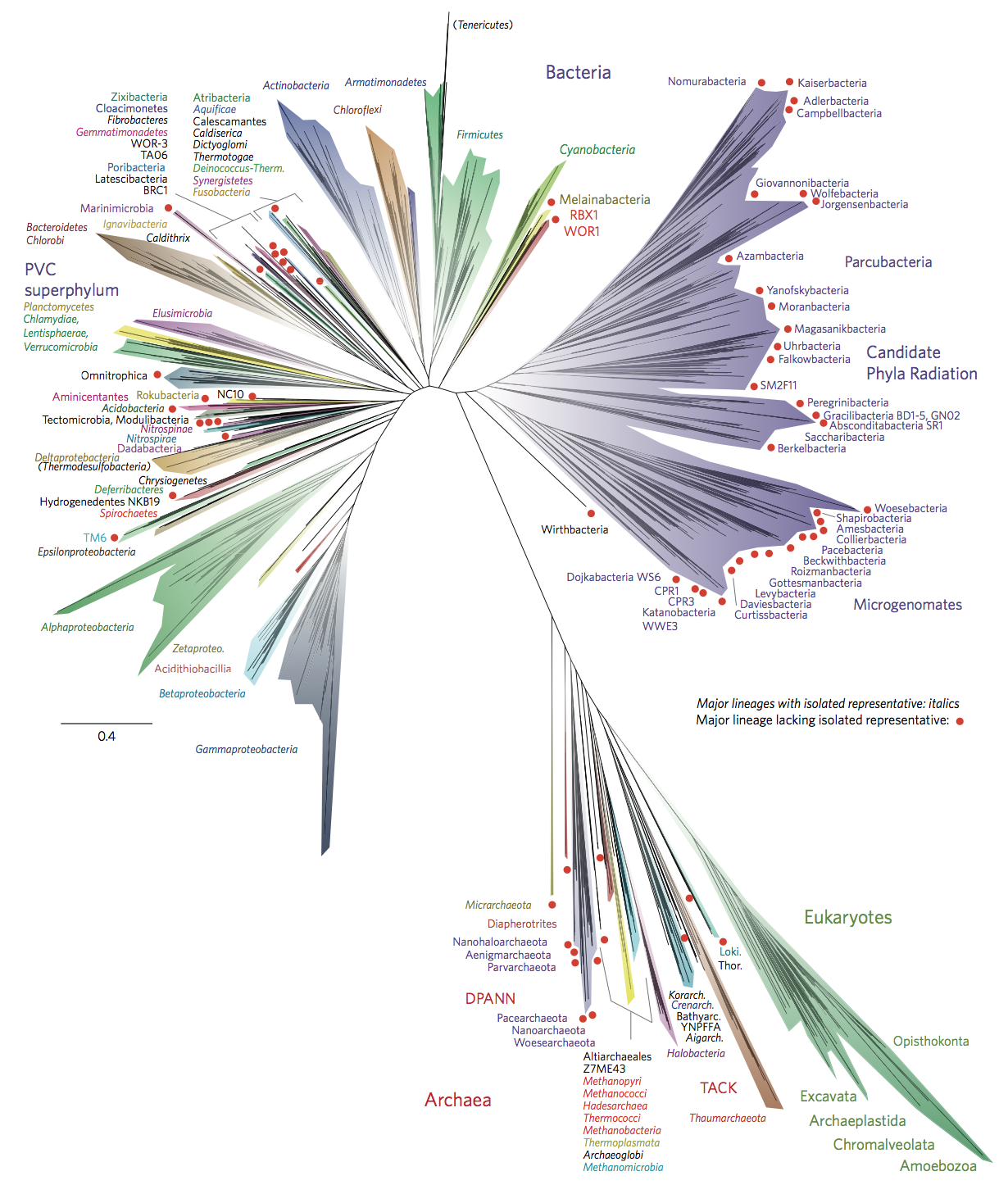
Phylogenetic tree showing the diversity of prokaryotes, mainly Bacteria. The eukaryotes appear bottom right as a branch of the Archaea.

=== As distinct from eukaryotes ===
Prokaryote, to same scale

Part of a eukaryotic cell

Eukaryotic cells are some 10,000 times larger than prokaryotic cells by volume, have their DNA organised in a nucleus, and contain membrane-bound organelles.

The division between prokaryotes and eukaryotes has been considered the most important distinction or difference among organisms. The distinction is that eukaryotic cells have a "true" nucleus containing their DNA, whereas prokaryotic cells do not have a nucleus. Eukaryotic cells are some 10,000 times larger than prokaryotic cells by volume, and contain membrane-bound organelles.

Both eukaryotes and prokaryotes contain ribosomes which produce proteins as specified by the cell's DNA. Prokaryote ribosomes are smaller than those in eukaryote cytoplasm, but similar to those inside mitochondria and chloroplasts, one of several lines of evidence that those organelles derive from bacteria incorporated by symbiogenesis.

The genome in a prokaryote is held within a DNA/protein complex in the cytosol called the nucleoid, which lacks a nuclear envelope. The complex contains a single circular chromosome, a cyclic, double-stranded molecule of stable chromosomal DNA, in contrast to the multiple linear, compact, highly organized chromosomes found in eukaryotic cells. In addition, many important genes of prokaryotes are stored in separate circular DNA structures called plasmids. Like eukaryotes, prokaryotes may partially duplicate genetic material, and can have a haploid chromosomal composition that is partially replicated.

Prokaryotes vs Eukaryotes
Domain	Nucleus	Organelles	Reproduction
Prokaryotes	None, DNA is free in cytoplasm	Few	Asexual, with horizontal gene transfer
Eukaryotes	DNA in nucleus	Membrane-bound organelles, inc. endoplasmic reticulum, mitochondria, chloroplasts	Sexual reproduction with haploid gametes

Prokaryotes lack mitochondria and chloroplasts. Instead, processes such as oxidative phosphorylation and photosynthesis take place across the prokaryotic cell membrane. Prokaryotes possess some internal structures, such as prokaryotic cytoskeletons. It was previously suggested that the bacterial phylum Planctomycetota has a membrane around the nucleoid and contains other membrane-bound cellular structures. Further investigation revealed that Planctomycetota cells are not compartmentalized or nucleated and, like other bacterial membrane systems, are interconnected.

Prokaryotic cells are usually much smaller than eukaryotic cells. This causes prokaryotes to have a larger surface-area-to-volume ratio, giving them a higher metabolic rate, a higher growth rate, and as a consequence, a shorter generation time than eukaryotes.

=== Eukaryotes as Archaea ===
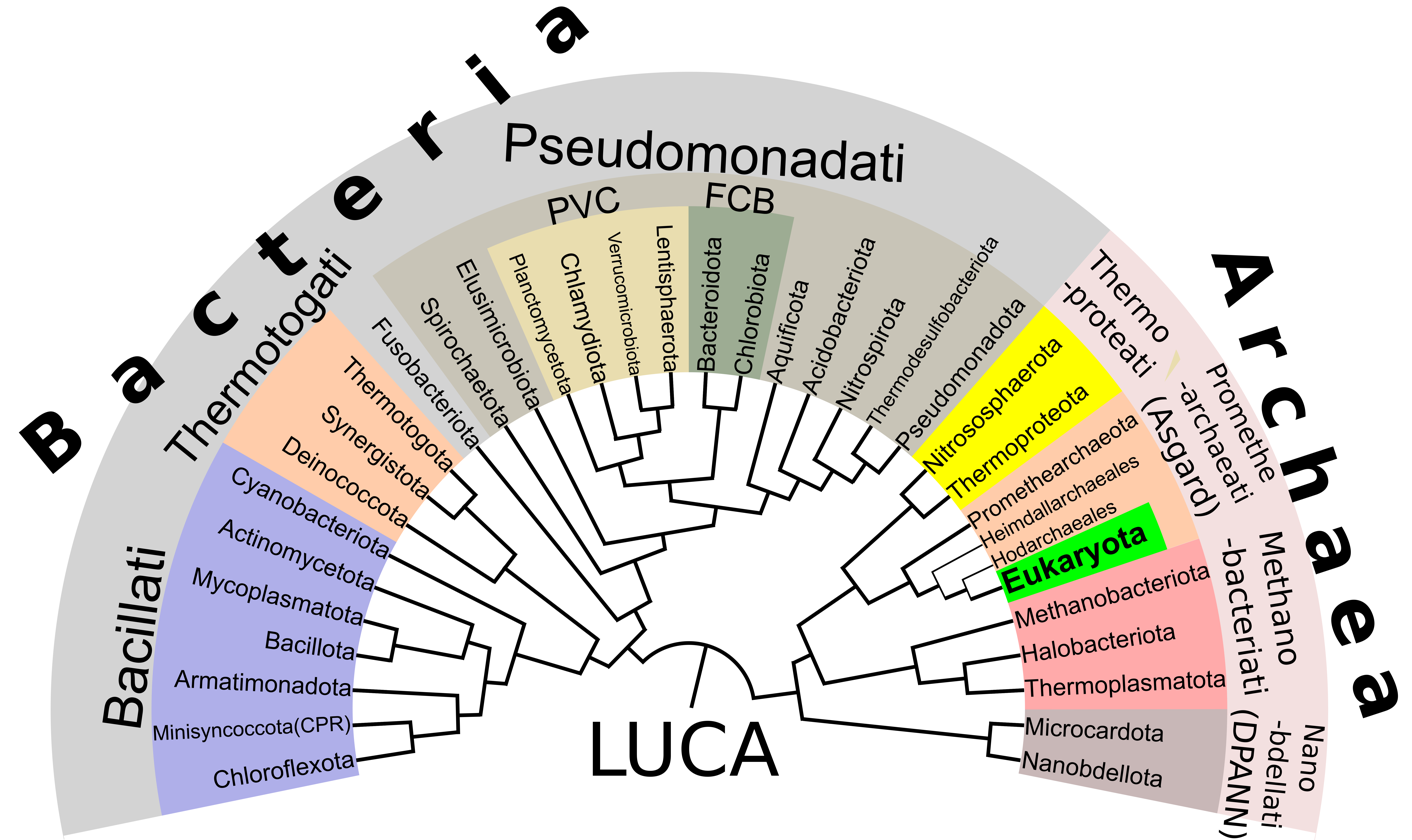
Phylogenetic tree showing the diversity of prokaryotes. This 2018 proposal shows eukaryotes within the archaean Asgard group which represents a modern version of the eocyte hypothesis. In this view, the division between bacteria and the rest is what groups organisms into the two major domains.

There is increasing evidence that the roots of the eukaryotes are to be found in the archaean Asgard group, perhaps Heimdallarchaeota. For example, histones, which usually package DNA in eukaryotic nuclei, are found in several archaean groups, giving evidence for homology. A proposed non-bacterial group comprising Archaea and Eukaryota was called Neomura by Thomas Cavalier-Smith in 2002.

Eukaryotes as Archaea
Domain	Histone proteins	ATP synthase	DNA replication
Archaea, inc. Eukaryota	All are similar in these two groups, implying homology and relatedness		
Bacteria	(missing)	Present in a very different form	

Another view is that the most important difference between biota may be the division between Bacteria and the rest (Archaea and Eukaryota). DNA replication differs fundamentally between the Bacteria and Archaea (including that in eukaryotic nuclei), and it may not be homologous between these two groups.

Further, ATP synthase, though homologous in all organisms, differs greatly between bacteria (including eukaryotic organelles such as mitochondria and chloroplasts) and the archaea/eukaryote nucleus group. The last common ancestor of all life (called LUCA) should have possessed an early version of this protein complex. As ATP synthase is obligate membrane bound, this supports the assumption that LUCA was a cellular organism. The RNA world hypothesis might clarify this scenario, as LUCA might have lacked DNA, but had an RNA genome built by ribosomes as suggested by Woese.

A ribonucleoprotein world has been proposed based on the idea that oligopeptides may have been built together with primordial nucleic acids at the same time, which supports the concept of a ribocyte as LUCA. The feature of DNA as the material base of the genome might have then been adopted separately in bacteria and in archaea (and later eukaryote nuclei), presumably with the help of some viruses (possibly retroviruses as they could reverse transcribe RNA to DNA).

== See also ==
- Bacterial cell structure
- Evolution of cells
- List of sequenced archaeal genomes
- List of sequenced bacterial genomes
- Marine prokaryotes
- Parakaryon myojinensis
