= Cheryl Kerfeld =

American bioengineer

Cheryl Ann Kerfeld
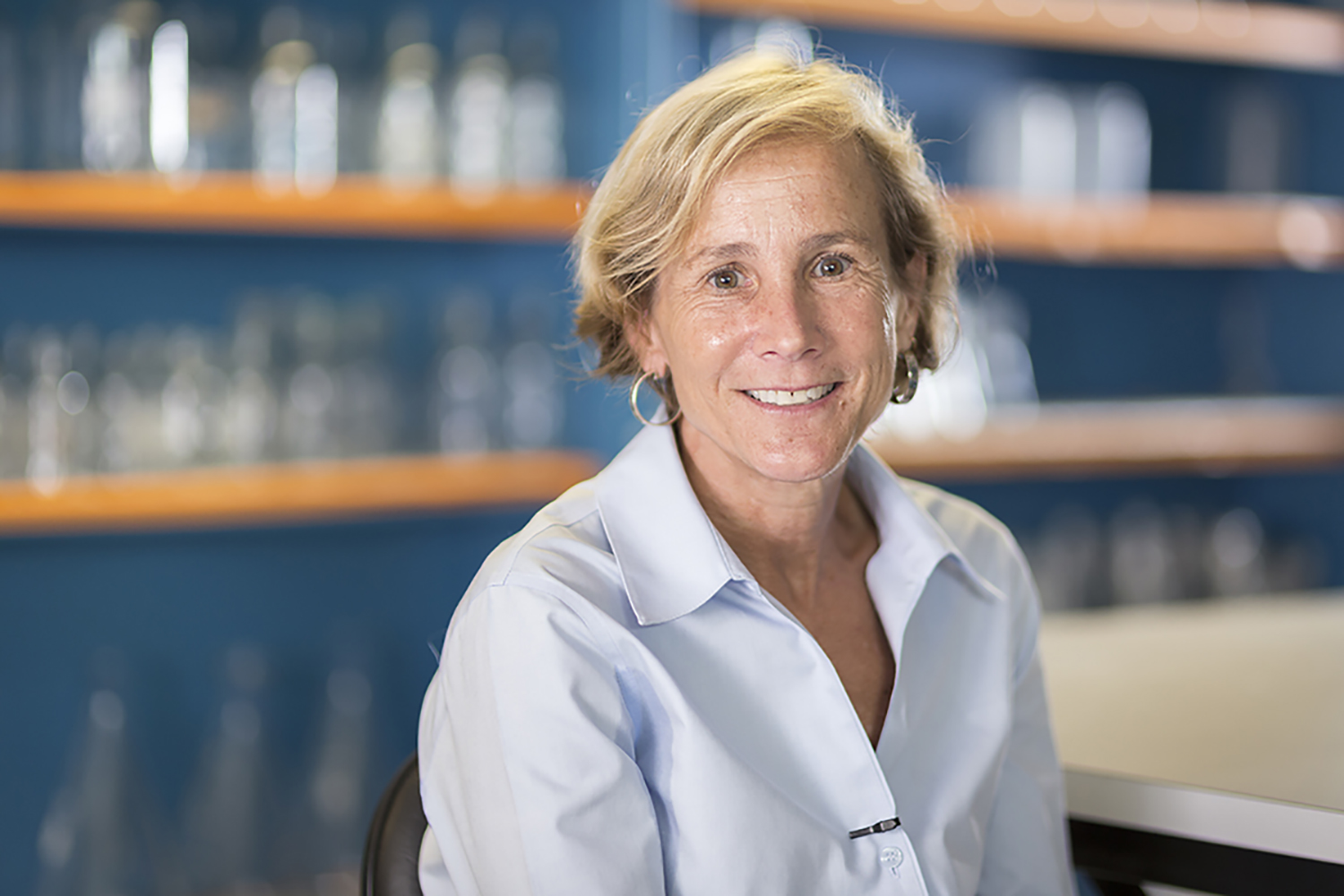
- Cheryl Kerfeld
- Education: University of California, Los Angeles (PhD); University of Minnesota
- Scientific career
- Workplaces: Michigan State University; Lawrence Berkeley National Laboratory
- Thesis: Biochemical and structural characterization of proteins involved in photosynthesis : the pigment proteins of Chromatium purpuratum and cytochrome c6 of Chlamydomonas reinhardtii (1993)
- Website: Kerfeld Lab

Cheryl Ann Kerfeld is an American bioengineer who is Hannah Distinguished Professor at Michigan State University. She holds a joint position at the Lawrence Berkeley National Laboratory. Her research considers bioinformatics, cellular imaging and structural biology.

== Education ==
Kerfeld majored in biology and English literature at the University of Minnesota, graduating magna cum laude 1983, and with the Captain Jennings DeWitt Payne award for excellence in literary studies. While a junior scientist in the University of Minnesota's department of microbiology, she completed a master's degree in English through the Regents’ Scholars program. Kerfeld obtained her PhD in Biology at UCLA, focusing on the light harvesting complex of purple sulfur bacteria. After finishing her doctorate, Kerfeld was awarded a National Science Foundation (NSF) Postdoctoral Fellowship with which she continued research in the department of biochemistry at UCLA.

== Career ==
After completing her postdoctoral studies, Kerfeld developed an undergraduate curriculum that incorporated research experience, including the Undergraduate Genomics Research Initiative. In 2007, Kerfeld joined the US Department of Energy’s Joint Genome Institute, where she worked on the development of a web-based platform for implementing bioinformatics into undergraduate courses and research projects. These efforts were recognized with the American Society of Biochemistry and Molecular Biology’s Award for Exemplary Contributions to Education in 2011.

While primarily focusing on bioinformatics education for the JGI, Kerfeld was an adjunct professor in the Department of Plant and Microbial Biology at UC Berkeley and continued to build a research program in Bacterial Microcompartments and Carotenoid Proteins. She also led the first large scale genome sequencing project for the Phylum Cyanobacteria, a collaboration between the US Department of Energy Joint Genome Institute and the Pasteur Culture Collection of Paris.

In 2013, Kerfeld shifted focus fully to research, becoming the Hannah Distinguished Professor of Structural Bioengineering at Michigan State University while retaining her laboratory in Berkeley with appointments in the Molecular Biophysics and Integrated Bioimaging Division and the Environmental Genomics and Systems Biology Division at LBNL. Her research has focused on two main areas: Bacterial Microcompartments, metabolic organelles found in bacteria, and the structure and function of modular carotenoid-binding proteins are involved in the mediation of cyanobacterial photoprotection.

At Michigan State, Kerfeld leads one of three program areas for the MSU-DOE Plant Research Laboratory. In 2019, Kerfeld became the lead of a National Science Foundation research program that looks to engineer a synthetic cell without lipids. Since 2022, Kerfeld leads a US Department of Energy Energy Frontier Research Center, the Center for Catalysis in Biomimetic Confinement, which is a collaboration among scientists at Michigan State University, Argonne National Laboratory and Berkeley National Laboratory.

Throughout her academic career Kerfeld has continued an active interest in the arts and humanities, writing book and art reviews for the Minnesota Daily, the LA Village View, the San Diego Union Tribune, the San Francisco Chronicle and PLOS Biology: Physics Incarnate and When Art, Science, and Culture Commingle. She also collaborates with artists, art educators and philosophers.

== Awards and honors ==
- 2011 American Society for Biochemistry and Molecular Biology Award for Exemplary Contributions to Education
- 2019 Elected Fellow of the American Association for the Advancement of Science
