= Encapsulin =

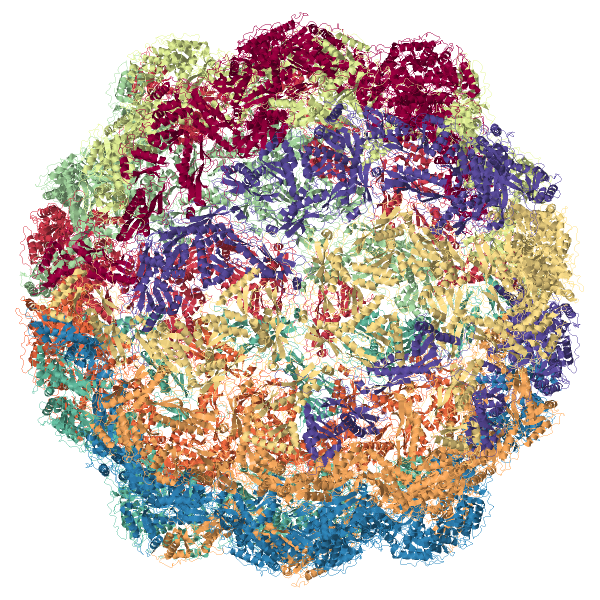
- EM structure of Myxococcus xanthus encpasulin protein (EncA) PDB entry 4pt2

Identifiers
- Symbol: Linocin_M18
- Pfam: PF04454
- InterPro: IPR007544
Available protein structures:
- PDB: IPR007544 PF04454 (ECOD; PDBsum)
- AlphaFold: IPR007544; PF04454

The encapsulins are a family of bacterial proteins that serve as the main structural components of encapsulin nanocompartments. There are several different encapsulin proteins, including EncA, which forms the shell, and EncB, EncC, and EncD, which form the core. They are found in bacteria and archaea. They serve as intracellular structures that compartmentalize specific biochemical reactions. They are highly versatile systems and protect cargo proteins from environmental damage and optimize the efficiency of enzymatic processes.

Encapsulins are used in synthetic biology, microbiology, structural biology, nanotechnology, and biotechnology. They are hard to discover due to their similarity to phage proteins.

== History ==
Encapsulins were discovered in 1994 as a new class of prokaryotic compartments. Prokaryotic cells usually lack membrane compartments typical for eukaryotes. They instead have numerous protein compartments that are capable of accumulating a large number of molecules. The encapsulin systems were first identified through the use of bioinformatics that linked capsid-like proteins to specific operons in bacterial and archaeal genomes.

When protein nanocompartments were discovered in 1994, and later renamed encapsulins, they were found in the supernatant fluid of the Brevibacterium linens culture. This bacterium is present on human skin.

Since 1994, over 6,000 systems have been identified across 31 bacterial and four archaeal phyla. Encapsulins have also been discovered to be found in extremophiles inhabiting hydrothermal vents.

In 2008, encapsulins were identified as protein-based systems for compartmentalization, serving specific functions within cellular organisms. 2008 is also when they started to be called encapsulins. Recent advances in metagenomics, cryo-electron microscopy, and X-ray crystallography have expanded the known diversity and revealed more intricate details about the assembly and functionality of encapsulins.

== Structure ==
Encapsulin shells compromise icosahedral complexes (12 vertices, 20 faces, 30 edges) formed as a result of self-assembly of protomers. These encapsulin shells have diameters between 24 and 42 nm and are defined by the HK97-fold of their shell protein. The HK97-fold protomer has a roughly triangular shape and consists of three conserved domains: the axial domain, the peripheral domain, and the extended loop. The size and symmetry of the capsid are defined by a triangulation number (T), which determines the number of subunits in the assembly. For example:

- T = 1 encapsulins (Thermotoga martima) consist of 60 protomers.
- T = 3 encapsulins (Pyrococcus furiosus) consist of 180 protomers.
- T = 4 encapsulins (Quasibacillus thermotolerans) consist of 240 protomers.

== Function ==
Encapsulins serve many physiological functions, including catalysis of specialized reactions involving reactive species, iron detoxification and mineral storage, response to oxidative stress, and secondary metabolism. There are ferritin-like encapsulins as well. Encapsulins from bacteria and extremophiles can withstand a wide temperature range and wide pH. They can also be engineered to have surface-exposed shell-fusion proteins.

=== Cargo loading mechanism ===
Encapsulins selectively encapsulate cargo proteins through targeting. They use C-terminal targeting peptides (TPs) found in family 1 encapsulins, and N-terminal targeting domains (TDs) found in family 2 encapsulins. These interact with the shell interior during self-assembly, enabling precise cargo loading. This has been researched for applications in synthetic biology.

=== Genomic organization ===
Encapsulin systems are encoded in operons alongside their cargo proteins and sometimes alongside their accessory genes. The operons are conserved across diverse organisms and can include:

- Genes for one or multiple cargo proteins with specific targeting peptides.
- Regulatory or accessory genes that enhance functionality or interaction with other pathways.
- Genes encoding the encapsulin shell protein.

== Classification ==
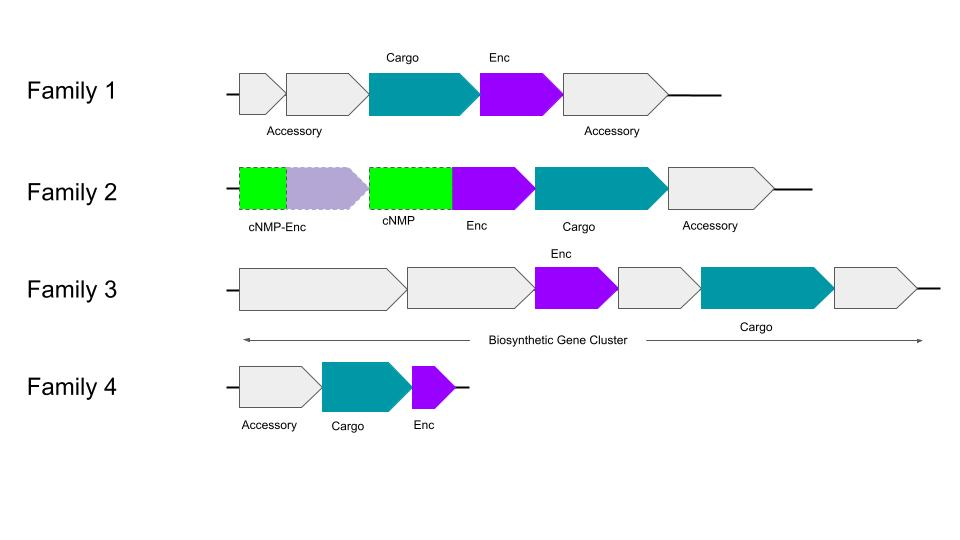
Encapsulin-capsid components are shown in purple. Cargo proteins are shown in teal. Non-cargo accessory components are shown in grey. Dotted lines show optional operon components.

Encapsulins can be classified into four different families based on their cargo type and operon structure.

=== Family 1 ===
These encapsulins likely evolved in response to the need for intracellular iron homeostasis. This family of encapsulins typically encapsulate peroxidases of ferritin-like proteins. They are characterized by the encapsulin shell proteins encoded alongside ferritin-like proteins as cargo. The operons usually include genes for ferroxidase enzymes, critical for iron oxidation. They belong to the Pfam family (Encapsulating Protein for Peroxidase) and use short C-terminal targeting (TPs) for cargo loading. This family of encapsulins provide a controlled environment for iron storage and detoxification, as well as preventing oxidative stress.

=== Family 2 ===
This family is the largest. Their systems are found in multiple bacterial phyla. They are usually associated with various cargo enzymes like cysteine desulfurase, polyprenyl transferase, terpene cyclase, and xylulose kinase. This family can contain cyclic nucleotide-monophosphate (cNMP) binding domains and use larger N-terminal targeting domains (TDs) for cargo encapsulation. This family is split into subfamilies 2A and 2B. 2A is distinguished by the presence of cNMP binding domains. This family of encapsulins often encapsulates enzymes that are involved in sulfur and carbon metabolism.

=== Family 3 ===
This family is the Phage capsid family. These encapsulins are found primarily within biosynthetic gene clusters. They are associated with specific pathways in Actinobacteria and Proteobacteria. Their operons might interact with lipids. They are currently putative and lack experimental validation.

=== Family 4 ===
This family is the DUF1884 domain-containing protein family of encapsulins. They have a truncated form of the HK97-fold and are considered putative, with their ability to self-assemble and encapsulate cargo proteins still unknown. This family is limited to thermophilic and anaerobic microorganisms from hydrothermal vents. They are hypothesized to form specialized nanocompartments adapted to extreme environmental conditions.

== Biomedical and biotechnological applications ==
Encapsulins have become widely used and are gaining more attention in biomolecular and protein engineering applications due to their strong self-assembly properties and ease of engineering. They are used and have significant potential for:

- Drug Delivery: Engineered for targeted delivery of therapeutic agents.
- Imaging: Functionalized for use as MRI contrast agents.
- Vaccines: Surface display of antigens for vaccine development, e.g., SARS-CoV-2 antigen studies.
- Bioreactors: Utilized as nanocontainers for enzymatic reactions.
- Biosensors: Leverage their metal-binding encapsulation specificity for diagnostic tools.

== Current research ==
Recent and ongoing research aims to uncover new encapsulin systems through metagenomics and to continue to explore their biotechnological potential. In synthetic biology, research is focusing on engineering encapsulin systems to perform novel tasks, like drug synthesis or bioremediation.
