= BMC domain =

BMC
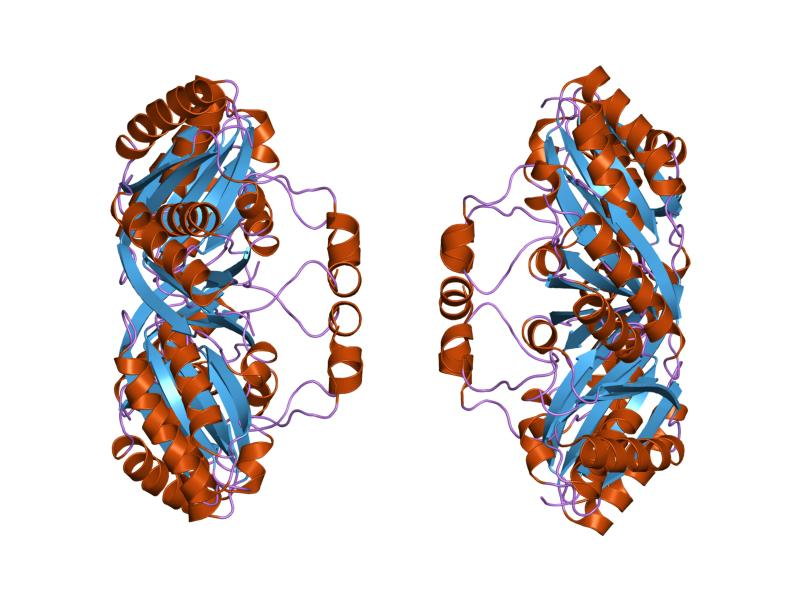
- carboxysome shell protein ccmk2

Identifiers
- Symbol: BMC
- Pfam: PF00936
- InterPro: IPR000249
- PROSITE: PDOC00876
- CDD: cd06169
Available protein structures:
- PDB: IPR000249 PF00936 (ECOD; PDBsum)
- AlphaFold: IPR000249; PF00936

In molecular biology the Bacterial Microcompartment (BMC) domain is a protein domain found in a variety of shell proteins, including CsoS1A, CsoS1B and CsoS1C of Thiobacillus neapolitanus (Halothiobacillus neapolitanus) and their orthologs from other bacteria. These shell proteins form the polyhedral structure of the carboxysome and related structures that plays a metabolic role in bacteria. The BMC domain consists of about 90 amino acid residues, characterized by β-α-β motif connected by a β-hairpin.

The majority of the shell proteins consist of a single BMC domain in each subunit, forming a hexameric structure that assembles to form the flat facets of the polyhedral shell. To date, two shell proteins were found to consist a tandem BMC domains, of which forms a trimeric structure, giving a pseudo-hexameric appearance.
