= Carboxysome =

Bacterial microcompartment containing the enzyme RuBisCo

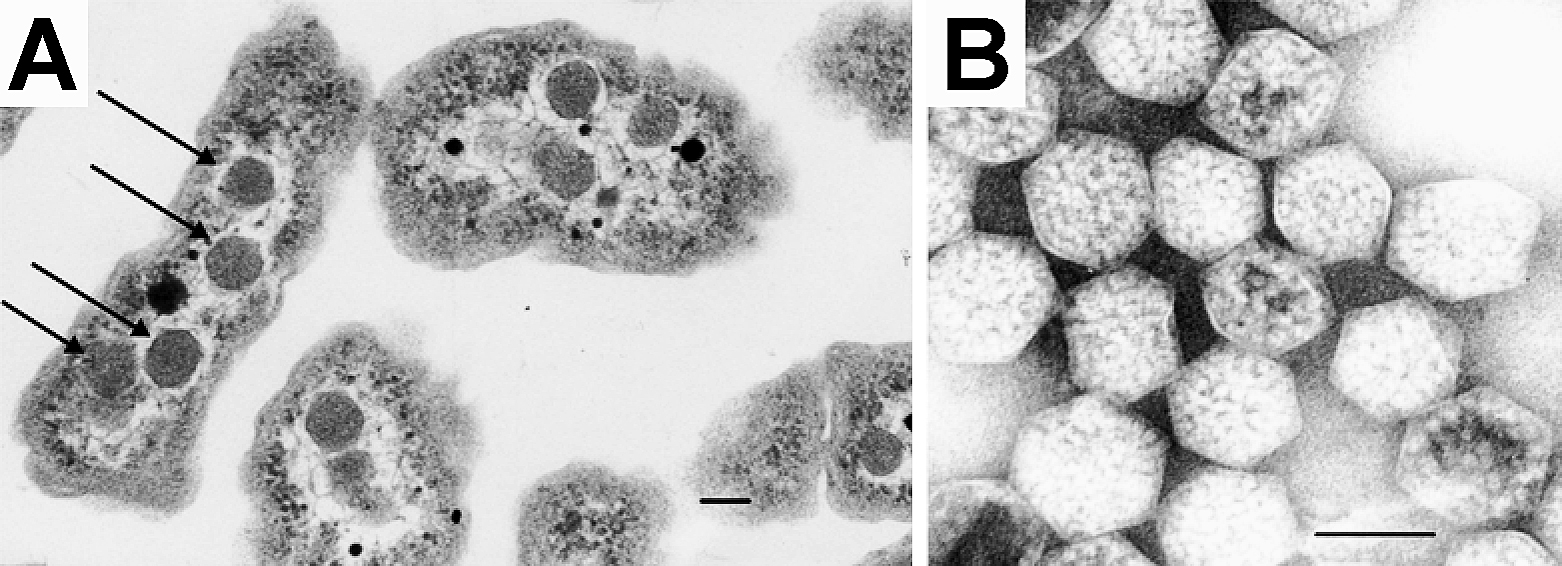
Electron micrographs showing alpha-carboxysomes from the chemoautotrophic bacterium Halothiobacillus neapolitanus: (A) arranged within the cell, and (B) intact upon isolation. Scale bars indicate 100 nm.

Carboxysomes are bacterial microcompartments (BMCs) consisting of polyhedral protein shells filled with the enzymes ribulose-1,5-bisphosphate carboxylase/oxygenase (RuBisCO)—the predominant enzyme in carbon fixation and the rate limiting enzyme in the Calvin cycle—and carbonic anhydrase.

Carboxysomes are thought to have evolved as a consequence of the increase in oxygen concentration in the ancient atmosphere; this is because oxygen is a competing substrate to carbon dioxide in the RuBisCO reaction. To overcome the inefficiency of RuBisCO, carboxysomes concentrate carbon dioxide inside the shell by means of co-localized carbonic anhydrase activity, which produces carbon dioxide from the bicarbonate that diffuses into the carboxysome. The resulting concentration of carbon dioxide near RuBisCO decreases the proportion of ribulose-1,5-bisphosphate oxygenation and thereby avoids costly photorespiratory reactions. The surrounding shell provides a barrier to carbon dioxide loss, helping to increase its concentration around RuBisCO.

Carboxysomes are an essential part of the broader metabolic network called the Carbon dioxide-Concentrating Mechanism (CCM), which functions in two parts: (1) Membrane transporters concentrate inorganic carbon (C_{i}) in the cell cytosol which is devoid of carbonic anhydrases. Carbon is primarily stored in the form of HCO_{3}^{−} which cannot re-cross the lipid membrane, as opposed to neutral CO_{2} which can easily escape the cell. This stockpiles carbon in the cell, creating a disequilibrium between the intracellular and extracellular environments of about 30x the C_{i} concentration in water. (2) Cytosolic HCO_{3}^{−} diffuses into the carboxysome, where carboxysomal carbonic anhydrases dehydrate it back to CO_{2} in the vicinity of Rubisco, allowing Rubisco to operate at its maximal rate.

Carboxysomes are the best studied example of bacterial microcompartments, the term for functionally diverse organelles that are alike in having a protein shell.

== Discovery ==
Polyhedral bodies were discovered by transmission electron microscopy in the cyanobacterium Phormidium uncinatum in 1956. These were later observed in other cyanobacteria and in some chemotrophic bacteria that fix carbon dioxide—many of them are sulfur oxidizers or nitrogen fixers (for example, Halothiobacillus, Acidithiobacillus, Nitrobacter and Nitrococcus; all belonging to Pseudomonadota). The polyhedral bodies were first purified from Thiobacillus neapolitanus (now Halothiobacillus neapolitanus) in 1973 and shown to contain RuBisCO, held within a rigid outer covering. The authors proposed that since these appeared to be organelles involved in carbon dioxide fixation, they should be called carboxysomes.

== Architecture ==
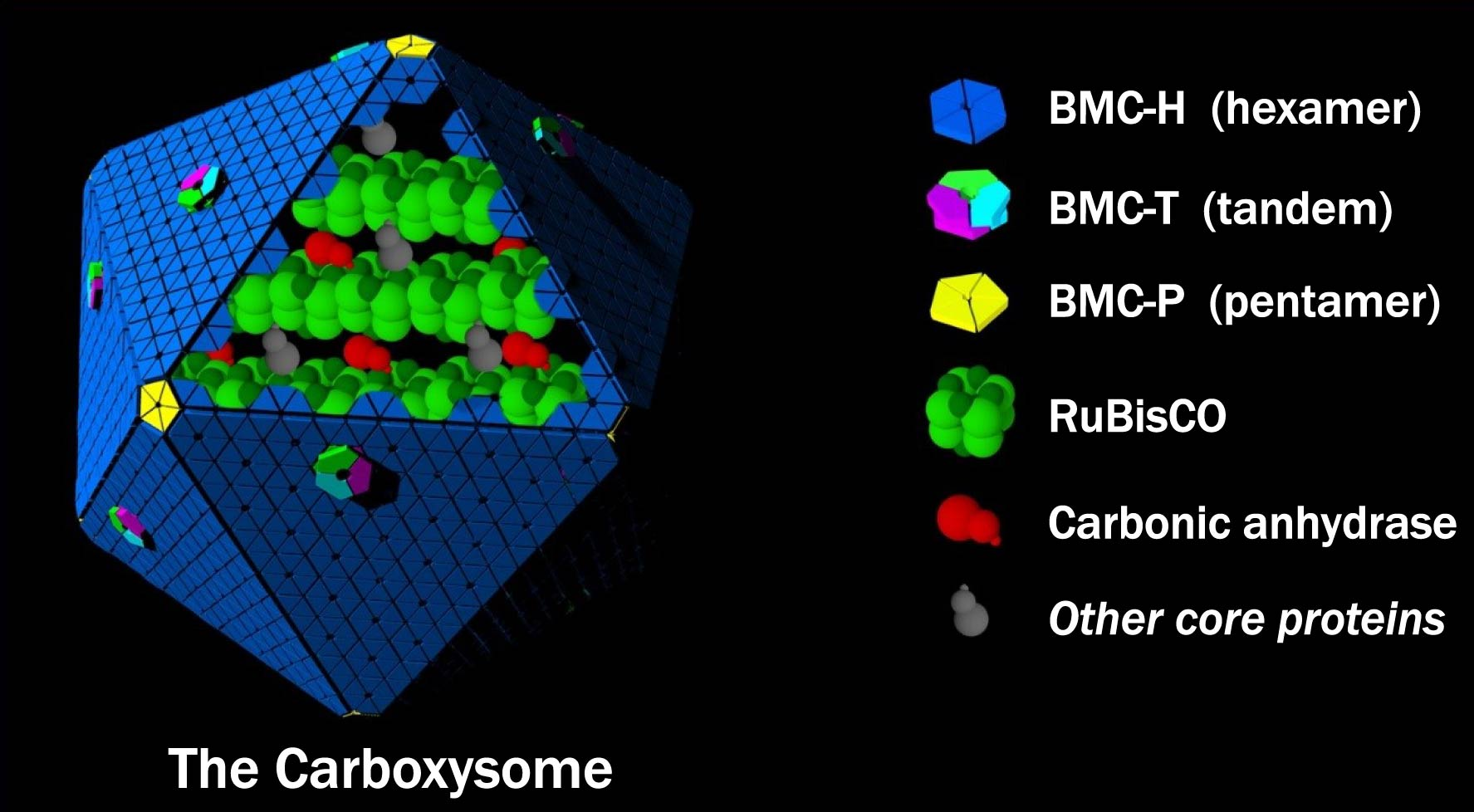
Model for the structure of the carboxysome. RuBisCO and carbonic anhydrase are arranged in an enzymatic core (organized by various core proteins) and encapsulated by a protein shell.

Structurally, carboxysomes are icosahedral, or quasi-icosahedral. Electron cryo-tomography studies have confirmed the approximately icosahedral geometry of the carboxysome, and have imaged Rubisco proteins inside arranged in a few concentric layers or fibril-like structures. The non-icosahedral faceted shapes of some carboxysomes can naturally be explained within the elastic theory of heterogeneous thin shells.

=== Shell proteins ===
The carboxysome has an outer shell composed of a few thousand protein subunits, with hexameric shell proteins populating the faces and pentameric shell proteins placed at the 12 icosahedral vertices. Proteins known to form the shell have been structurally characterized by X-ray crystallography. The proteins that constitute the majority of the shell form cyclical hexamers or pseudo-hexamers and belong to the BMC protein family. Small pores perforate many different types of BMC-H hexamers, and may serve as the route for diffusion of small substrates (e.g. bicarbonate) and products (3-phosphoglycerate) into and out of the carboxysome. Positively charged amino acids in the pores presumably help promote the diffusion of the negatively charged substrates and products. Other minor structural components of the shell that have been characterized include pentameric proteins (BMC-P proteins) which occupy the vertices of the icosahedral shell. A third building block of the carboxysome shell is a protein composed of two BMC domains in tandem (BMC-T proteins). Structurally, these are known to form trimers which are pseudohexameric. Some members of the BMC-T protein family stack in a face-to-face fashion and form tiny cages, notably both types of carboxysomes (alpha and beta, see below) contain these stacking trimers. Based on crystal structures, these protein cages have relatively large gated pores on both sides, and it has been proposed that the opening and closing of the pore could be controlled in a manner similar to an air-lock. Such an air-lock, in contrast to BMC-H proteins with constitutively open pores, has been suggested to serve as a route for larger substrates (ribulose-1,5-bisphosphate) and products (3-phosphoglycerate) that must cross the shell.

Production of empty carboxysome shells in E. coli enabled the first visualization of the carboxysome shell by cryo-electron microscopy.

A number of capsids, protein shells of viruses, are also icosahedral, composed of hexameric and pentameric proteins, but currently there is no evidence suggesting any evolutionary relationship between the carboxysome shell and viral capsids.

=== Scaffold proteins ===
All carboxysomes contain scaffold proteins that nucleate carboxysome components together during the assembly process. These scaffold proteins are required for carboxysome assembly; without them, carboxysomes do not form. The α-carboxysomal scaffold protein is called CsoS2, and the β-carboxysomal scaffold protein is called CcmM. Though CsoS2 and CcmM have related functions, they have no evolutionary or sequence similarity. Both proteins bind to Rubisco, thereby ensuring that Rubisco gets packaged during carboxysome biogenesis. Remarkably, both proteins bind to Rubisco at a binding site that bridges two large subunits while maintaining contact with the small subunit, ensuring that only the 16-subunit Rubisco holoenzyme is encapsulated. Both CsoS2 and CcmM have repetitive domain structures giving them multi-valent modes of binding. CcmM has three small-subutnit-like (SSUL) domains that bind to Rubisco, and CsoS2 has four N-terminal domain (NTD) repeats that bind Rubisco, making it possible for each single scaffold protein to bind up to 3-4 Rubiscos at a time. CsoS2 has also been shown to bind to shell proteins via its 7 Middle Region (MR) repeats and C-terminal domain (CTD). In α-carboxysomes, the CsoS2 MR repeats have been shown to define the size of the carboxysome.

== Two types of carboxysomes ==
There are two types of carboxysomes, alpha- and beta-carboxysomes. Although similar in appearance, they differ in their protein composition, including the form of RuBisCO they enclose. Furthermore, studies have revealed fundamental differences in their gene organization and possibly their assembly pathway. Based on bioinformatic studies of shell proteins, it appears that the two types of carboxysomes evolved independently.

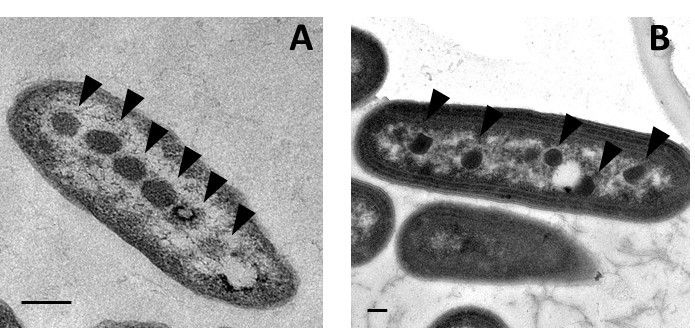
Electron micrograph of (A) alpha-carboxysomes in Halothiobacillus neapolitanus and (B) beta-carboxysomes in Synechococcus elongatus PCC 7942, indicated by arrows. Scale bars 200 nm.

=== Alpha-carboxysomes ===
Alpha-carboxysomes (α-carboxysomes) are also referred as the cso type of carboxysome. They contain Form IA RuBisCO; they are found in alpha-cyanobacteria and members of Pseudomonadota (some nitrifying bacteria, some sulfur-oxidizing bacteria such as Halothiobacillus neapolitanus, and some purple bacteria). The alpha-carboxysome was the first bacterial microcompartment to be purified and characterized.

Electron microscopy studies on purified alpha-carboxysomes or cell sections containing alpha-carboxysomes revealed that they are typically 100-160 nm in diameter. Common building blocks for the shell of alpha-carboxysomes are called CsoS1A/B/C (BMC-H), CsoS4A/B (BMC-P), and CsoS1D (BMC-T). CsoS4A/B were the first BMC-P proteins to be experimentally demonstrated as minor components of the BMC shell (only 12 pentamers are required to cap the vertices of an icosahedron). CsoS1D is the first BMC-T which has been structurally characterized; it is also the first example of dimerization of two BMC building blocks in a face-to-face fashion to create a tiny cage. The CsoS1D cage has a gated pore at both ends, which is proposed to facilitate the transfer of large metabolites across the shell. In addition to the specific form of RuBisCO, other encapsulated proteins distinguish alpha-carboxysomes from beta-carboxysomes such as scaffold protein CsoS2 and carbonic anhydrase CsoSCA. CsoS2 is an intrinsically disordered protein with an essential role in alpha-carboxysome assembly. It has a very high pI and a unique primary structure with three domains: an N-terminal, a middle- and a C-terminal domain. Repetitive motifs can be identified in all three regions; the N-terminal domain repeats bind to Rubisco, the middle region domains bind to shell proteins, and the c-terminal domain repeats also bind to shell proteins. CsoSCA is a beta-carbonic anhydrase that binds to Rubisco and has been found to be allosterically regulated by the Rubisco substrate, ribulose,1-5,bisphosphate (RuBP) in alpha-cyanobacteria. Studies in Halothiobacillus neapolitanus have shown that empty shells of normal shape and composition are assembled in carboxysomal RuBisCO-lacking mutants, suggesting that alpha-carboxysome shell biogenesis and enzyme sequestration are two independent, but functionally linked processes. Carboxysomes of Halothiobacillus neapolitanus have been found to accommodate chimeric and heterologous species of RuBisCO. It is the large subunit of RuBisCO which determines whether the enzyme is sequestered into carboxysomes.

=== Beta-carboxysomes ===
Beta-carboxysomes (β-carboxysomes) are found in cyanobacteria, specifically the "beta-cyanobacteria".

The signature proteins of the beta-carboxysome are Form IB RuBisCO and a gamma carbonic anhydrase homolog. Beta-carboxysomes are typically larger than alpha-carboxysomes: the observed diameters vary from 200 to 400 nm. The structural proteins that are essential for beta-carboxysome formation are encoded in the conserved carboxysome locus known as the ccm locus. The ccm locus includes genes for core proteins CcmM and CcmN and the shell proteins CcmK (a BMC-H protein), CcmL (a BMC-P protein) and CcmO (a BMC-T protein).

A full length CcmM protein consists of a gamma-carbonic anhydrase domain and three to five RubisCO small subunit-like domains (SSLDs) on its C-terminus. The ccmM gene contains an internal translation site that produces a short form of CcmM which only consists of SSLDs; both long and short forms of CcmM are required for beta-carboxysome assembly. CcmN contains multiple hexapeptide-repeat domains on its N-terminus and a short α-helical encapsulation peptide on the C-terminus.

Other structural components of beta-carboxysomes are encoded outside of the ccm locus. CcmP is a BMC-T protein that is absolutely conserved among organisms that form beta-carboxysomes. Two CcmP pseudohexamers stack to form a nanocompartment—an example of an air-lock forming protein. Likewise, in some cyanobacterial strains the beta-carboxysomes contain a beta-carbonic anhydrase that is not encoded in the ccm locus.

Shell proteins of beta carboxysomes are relatively diverse compared to their counterparts in the alpha carboxysomes, and this has been proposed to reflect variable permeability requirements of beta carboxysomes, which are found in cyanobacteria that occupy ecophysiologically dynamic environments.

The beta-carboxysome assembles from the inside out. First an enzymatic core forms that is subsequently encapsulated by the protein shell. Carboxysome assembly occurs through a series of protein-protein interactions: the enzyme RuBisCO and the two isoforms (full length and short form) of the CcmM protein interact by means of the SSLDs; in strains containing CcaA the beta-carbonic anhydrase is brought into the carboxysome core by interaction with the N-terminus of the full length CcmM. Once the procarboxysome (the carboxysome core) is formed, the N-terminus of the adapter protein CcmN interacts with the N-terminus of CcmM, while the C-terminus of CcmN recruits the shell proteins CcmK (BMC-H) and CcmO (BMC-T), utilizing a 15-20 amino acids long peptide. This encapsulation peptide forms an amphipathic a-helix that interacts with the shell components and its role is essential, given that in its absence, carboxysomes cannot be formed. The final step is the addition of the vertices formed by the BMC-P protein CcmL, which then cap the enzymatic core and facets. Elucidation of the assembly pathway of beta carboxysomes enabled the design of a single synthetic protein that replaced four other proteins in carboxysome assembly.

== Potential uses of the carboxysome in biotechnology ==
As is the case with other BMCs, the carboxysome is attracting significant attention by researchers for applications in plant synthetic biology. The transfer of a genetic module coding for an alpha-carboxysome has been shown to produce carboxysome-like structures in E. coli. Bioengineering of carboxysome shells has been shown to be feasible, and beta-carboxysomes constructed with chimeric proteins or with chimeric shells have been reported. The introduction of carboxysomes into plant chloroplasts as part of a CO_{2} concentrating mechanism such as that found in cyanobacteria is predicted to significantly improve net CO_{2} fixation and yield. Expression of beta-carboxysomal shell proteins and Form IB Rubisco-CcmM complexes in tobacco chloroplasts has been achieved, but did not result in compartments containing RuBisCO. A further advance has been the construction of minimal alpha-carboxysomes containing Form IA Rubisco and the CsoS1A and CsoS2 proteins from the cyanobacterium Cyanobium PCC7001 in tobacco chloroplasts. As yet, identifiably functional carboxysomes have not been constructed in plant chloroplasts. Improvement of photosynthesis in plants using this approach is ultimately dependent on the operation of transporter proteins in the chloroplast inner envelope membrane to help generate a high concentration of bicarbonate inside the chloroplast.

Potential applications of carboxysomes (list format):

1. Engineer the carbon dioxide-concentrating mechanism (CCM) and carboxysomes into industrially relevant microbes, potentially converting heterotrophic organisms into mixotrophs or autotrophs that capture CO_{2} while producing high value products.
2. Engineer the carbon dioxide-concentrating mechanism (CCM) and carboxysomes into plants for increased CO_{2} capture and enhanced growth.
3. Engineer faster Rubiscos. The fastest form I prokaryotic Rubiscos are mostly found in α-carboxysomes.
4. Engineer a minimal carboxysome gene set (Rubisco, carbonic anhydrase, scaffold protein, hexameric shell, pentameric shell) to facilitate facile engineering into alternative host organisms.
5. Design in vitro carboxysomes for cell-free CO_{2} fixation.
6. Engineer carboxysomes to have alternative metabolisms.

== Carboxysome reviews (by year) ==
Carboxysome research expands every year. Published reviews chart the rapid pace of discovery across the broad field of "carboxysomics".

First Author	Title	Year	Link
Shively et al.	Inclusion bodies of prokaryotes	1974	
Badger and Price	The CO_{2} concentrating mechanism in cyanobacteria and microalgae	1992	
Giordano et al.	CO_{2} Concentrating Mechanisms in Algae: Mechanisms, Environmental Modulation, and Evolution	2005	
Heinhorst et al.	Carboxysomes and Carboxysome-like Inclusions	2006	
Price et al.	Advances in understanding the cyanobacterial CO_{2}-concentrating-mechanism (CCM): functional components, Ci transporters, diversity, genetic regulation and prospects for engineering into plants	2008	
Espie et al.	Carboxysomes: cyanobacterial RubisCO comes in small packages	2011	
Kinney et al.	Comparative analysis of carboxysome shell proteins	2011	
Moroney et al.	Photorespiration and carbon concentrating mechanisms: two adaptations to high O2, low CO2 conditions	2013	
Rae et al.	Functions, Compositions, and Evolution of the Two Types of Carboxysomes: Polyhedral Microcompartments That Facilitate CO_{2} Fixation in Cyanobacteria and Some Proteobacteria	2013	
Hanson et al.	Towards engineering carboxysomes into C3 plants	2016	
Long et al.	Cyanobacterial CO₂-concentrating mechanism components: function and prospects for plant metabolic engineering	2016	
Kerfeld and Melnicki	Assembly, function and evolution of cyanobacterial carboxysomes	2016	
Rae et al.	Progress and challenges of engineering a biophysical CO_{2}-concentrating mechanism into higher plants	2017	
Turmo et al.	Carboxysomes: metabolic modules for CO_{2} fixation	2017	
Hennacy and Jonikas	Prospects for Engineering Biophysical CO2 Concentrating Mechanisms into Land Plants to Enhance Yields	2020	
Borden and Savage	New discoveries expand possibilities for carboxysome engineering	2021	
Huffine et al.	Computational modeling and evolutionary implications of biochemical reactions in bacterial microcompartments	2021	
Liu	Advances in the bacterial organelles for CO_{2} fixation	2021	
Liu et al.	Protein stoichiometry, structural plasticity and regulation of bacterial microcompartments	2021	
Trettel et al.	Modeling bacterial microcompartment architectures for enhanced cyanobacterial carbon fixation	2024	[20]
Trettel et al.	Dynamic structural determinants in bacterial microcompartment shells	2024	[21]
Santos Correa et al.	Carboxysomes: The next frontier in biotechnology and sustainable solutions	2024	[22]
Nguyen et al.	Understanding carboxysomes to enhance carbon fixation in crops	2025	[23]
Nguyen et al.	The Function, Evolution, and Future of Carboxysomes	2025	[24]
Hartzler et al.	Recent insights into α-carboxysome structure, mechanism, and assembly	2026	[25]
Li et al.	From fundamental understanding to engineering carboxysomes for biotechnological applications	2026	[26]

== See also ==
- Bacterial microcompartment
- BMC domain
- RuBisCO
- Pyrenoid
