= Cytosol =

Liquid found in cells

Cell biology
- Animal cell diagram
- Components of a typical animal cell: 1. Nucleolus; 2. Nucleus; 3. Ribosome (dots as part of 5); 4. Vesicle; 5. Rough endoplasmic reticulum 6. Golgi apparatus (or, Golgi body); 7. Cytoskeleton; 8. Smooth endoplasmic reticulum 9. Mitochondrion; 10. Vacuole; 11. Cytosol (fluid that contains organelles; with which, comprises cytoplasm); 12. Lysosome; 13. Centrosome; 14. Cell membrane

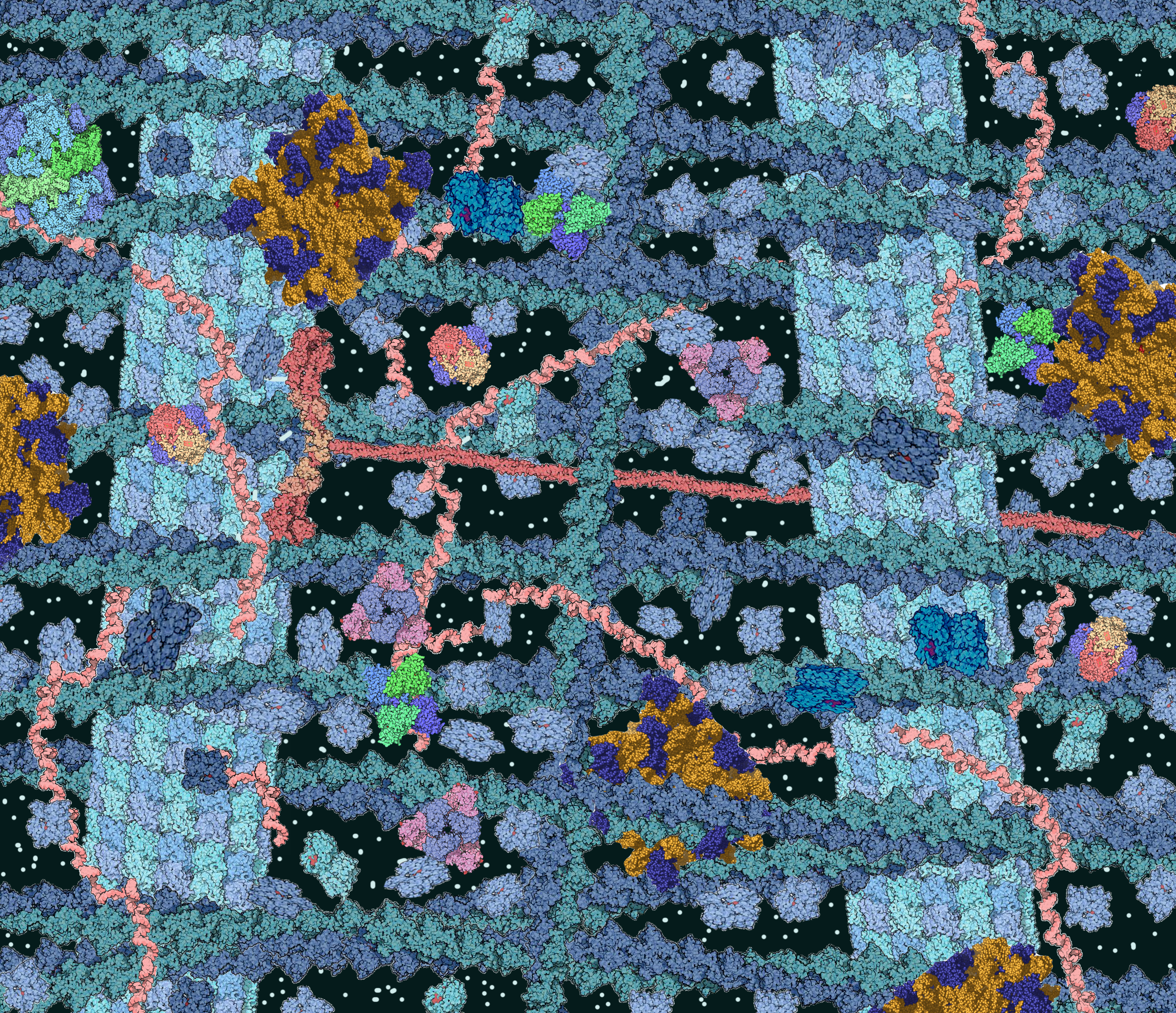
The cytosol is a crowded solution of many different types of molecules that occupy up to 30% of the cytoplasmic volume.

The cytosol, also known as cytoplasmic matrix or groundplasm, is one of the liquids found inside cells (intracellular fluid (ICF)). It is separated into compartments by membranes. For example, the mitochondrial matrix separates the mitochondrion into many compartments.

In the eukaryotic cell, the cytosol is surrounded by the cell membrane and is part of the cytoplasm, which also comprises the mitochondria, plastids, and other organelles (but not their internal fluids and structures); the cell nucleus is separate. The cytosol is thus a liquid matrix around the organelles. In prokaryotes, most of the chemical reactions of metabolism take place in the cytosol, while a few take place in membranes or in the periplasmic space. In eukaryotes, while many metabolic pathways still occur in the cytosol, others take place within organelles.

The cytosol is a complex mixture of substances dissolved in water. Although water forms the large majority of the cytosol, its structure and properties within cells is not well understood. The concentrations of ions such as sodium and potassium in the cytosol are different to those in the extracellular fluid; these differences in ion levels are important in processes such as osmoregulation, cell signaling, and the generation of action potentials in excitable cells such as endocrine, nerve and muscle cells. The cytosol also contains large amounts of macromolecules, which can alter how molecules behave, through macromolecular crowding.

Although it was once thought to be a simple solution of molecules, the cytosol has multiple levels of organization. These include concentration gradients of small molecules such as calcium, large complexes of enzymes that act together and take part in metabolic pathways, and protein complexes such as proteasomes, and carboxysomes (in bacteria) that enclose and separate parts of the cytosol.

== Definition ==
The term "cytosol" was first introduced in 1965 by H. A. Lardy, and initially referred to the liquid that was produced by breaking cells apart and pelleting all the insoluble components by ultracentrifugation. Such a soluble cell extract is not identical to the soluble part of the cell cytoplasm and is usually called a cytoplasmic fraction.

The term cytosol is now used to refer to the liquid phase of the cytoplasm in an intact cell. This excludes any part of the cytoplasm that is contained within organelles. Due to the possibility of confusion between the use of the word "cytosol" to refer to both extracts of cells and the soluble part of the cytoplasm in intact cells, the phrase "aqueous cytoplasm" has been used to describe the liquid contents of the cytoplasm of living cells.

Prior to this, other terms, including hyaloplasm, were used for the cell fluid, not always synonymously, as its nature was not well understood (see protoplasm).

== Properties and composition ==
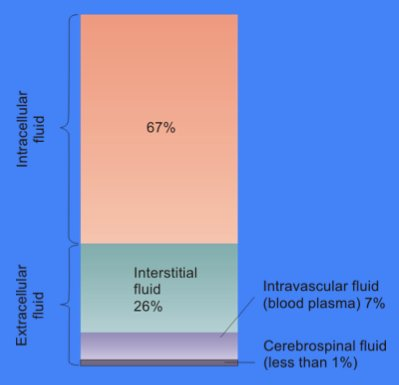
Intracellular fluid content in humans

The proportion of cell volume that is cytosol varies: for example while this compartment forms the bulk of cell structure in bacteria, in plant cells the main compartment is the large central vacuole. The cytosol consists mostly of water, dissolved ions, small molecules, and large water-soluble molecules (such as proteins). The majority of these non-protein molecules have a molecular mass of less than 300 Da. This mixture of small molecules is extraordinarily complex, as the variety of molecules that are involved in metabolism (the metabolites) is immense. For example, up to 200,000 different small molecules might be made in plants, although not all these will be present in the same species, or in a single cell. Estimates of the number of metabolites in single cells such as E. coli and baker's yeast predict that under 1,000 are made.

=== Water ===
Most of the cytosol is water, which makes up about 70% of the total volume of a typical cell. The pH of the intracellular fluid is about 7.4, while mouse cell cytosolic pH ranges between 7.0 and 7.4, and is usually higher if a cell is growing. The viscosity of cytoplasm is roughly the same as pure water, although diffusion of small molecules through this liquid is about fourfold slower than in pure water, due mostly to collisions with the large numbers of macromolecules in the cytosol. Studies in the brine shrimp have examined how water affects cell functions; these saw that a 20% reduction in the amount of water in a cell inhibits metabolism, with metabolism decreasing progressively as the cell dries out and all metabolic activity halting when the water level reaches 70% below normal.

Although water is vital for life, the structure of this water in the cytosol is not well understood, mostly because methods such as nuclear magnetic resonance spectroscopy only give information on the average structure of water, and cannot measure local variations at the microscopic scale. Even the structure of pure water is poorly understood, due to the ability of water to form structures such as water clusters through hydrogen bonds.

The classic view of water in cells is that about 5% of this water is strongly bound in by solutes or macromolecules as water of solvation, while the majority has the same structure as pure water. This water of solvation is not active in osmosis and may have different solvent properties, so that some dissolved molecules are excluded, while others become concentrated. However, others argue that the effects of the high concentrations of macromolecules in cells extend throughout the cytosol and that water in cells behaves very differently from the water in dilute solutions. These ideas include the proposal that cells contain zones of low and high-density water, which could have widespread effects on the structures and functions of the other parts of the cell. However, the use of advanced nuclear magnetic resonance methods to directly measure the mobility of water in living cells contradicts this idea, as it suggests that 85% of cell water acts like that pure water, while the remainder is less mobile and probably bound to macromolecules.

=== Ions ===
The concentrations of the other ions in cytosol are quite different from those in extracellular fluid and the cytosol also contains much higher amounts of charged macromolecules such as proteins and nucleic acids than the outside of the cell structure.

Typical ion concentrations in mammalian cytosol and plasma.
Ion	Concentration (millimolar)	
Ion	In cytosol	In plasma
Potassium	139–150	4
Sodium	12	145
Chloride	4	116
Bicarbonate	12	29
Amino acids in proteins	138	9
Magnesium	0.8	1.5
Calcium	<0.0002	1.8

In contrast to extracellular fluid, cytosol has a high concentration of potassium ions and a low concentration of sodium ions. This difference in ion concentrations is critical for osmoregulation, since if the ion levels were the same inside a cell as outside, water would enter constantly by osmosis - since the levels of macromolecules inside cells are higher than their levels outside. Instead, sodium ions are expelled and potassium ions taken up by the Na⁺/K⁺-ATPase, potassium ions then flow down their concentration gradient through potassium-selection ion channels, this loss of positive charge creates a negative membrane potential. To balance this potential difference, negative chloride ions also exit the cell, through selective chloride channels. The loss of sodium and chloride ions compensates for the osmotic effect of the higher concentration of organic molecules inside the cell.

Cells can deal with even larger osmotic changes by accumulating osmoprotectants such as betaines or trehalose in their cytosol. Some of these molecules can allow cells to survive being completely dried out and allow an organism to enter a state of suspended animation called cryptobiosis. In this state the cytosol and osmoprotectants become a glass-like solid that helps stabilize proteins and cell membranes from the damaging effects of desiccation.

The low concentration of calcium in the cytosol allows calcium ions to function as a second messenger in calcium signaling. Here, a signal such as a hormone or an action potential opens calcium channel so that calcium floods into the cytosol. This sudden increase in cytosolic calcium activates other signalling molecules, such as calmodulin and protein kinase C. Other ions such as chloride and potassium may also have signaling functions in the cytosol, but these are not well understood.

=== Macromolecules ===
Protein molecules that do not bind to cell membranes or the cytoskeleton are dissolved in the cytosol. The amount of protein in cells is extremely high, and approaches 200 mg/ml, occupying about 20–30% of the volume of the cytosol. However, measuring precisely how much protein is dissolved in cytosol in intact cells is difficult, since some proteins appear to be weakly associated with membranes or organelles in whole cells and are released into solution upon cell lysis. Indeed, in experiments where the plasma membrane of cells were carefully disrupted using saponin, without damaging the other cell membranes, only about one quarter of cell protein was released. These cells were also able to synthesize proteins if given ATP and amino acids, implying that many of the enzymes in cytosol are bound to the cytoskeleton. However, the idea that the majority of the proteins in cells are tightly bound in a network called the microtrabecular lattice is now seen as unlikely.

In prokaryotes the cytosol contains the cell's genome, within a structure known as a nucleoid. This is an irregular mass of DNA and associated proteins that control the transcription and replication of the bacterial chromosome and plasmids. In eukaryotes the genome is held within the cell nucleus, which is separated from the cytosol by nuclear pores that block the free diffusion of any molecule larger than about 10 nanometres in diameter.

This high concentration of macromolecules in cytosol causes an effect called macromolecular crowding, which is when the effective concentration of other macromolecules is increased, since they have less volume to move in. This crowding effect can produce large changes in both the rates and the position of chemical equilibrium of reactions in the cytosol. It is particularly important in its ability to alter dissociation constants by favoring the association of macromolecules, such as when multiple proteins come together to form protein complexes, or when DNA-binding proteins bind to their targets in the genome.

== Organization ==
Although the components of the cytosol are not separated into regions by cell membranes, these components do not always mix randomly and several levels of organization can localize specific molecules to defined sites within the cytosol.

=== Concentration gradients ===
Although small molecules diffuse rapidly in the cytosol, concentration gradients can still be produced within this compartment. A well-studied example of these are the "calcium sparks" that are produced for a short period in the region around an open calcium channel. These are about 2 micrometres in diameter and last for only a few milliseconds, although several sparks can merge to form larger gradients, called "calcium waves". Concentration gradients of other small molecules, such as oxygen and adenosine triphosphate may be produced in cells around clusters of mitochondria, although these are less well understood.

=== Protein complexes ===
Proteins can associate to form protein complexes, these often contain a set of proteins with similar functions, such as enzymes that carry out several steps in the same metabolic pathway. This organization can allow substrate channeling, which is when the product of one enzyme is passed directly to the next enzyme in a pathway without being released into solution. Channeling can make a pathway more rapid and efficient than it would be if the enzymes were randomly distributed in the cytosol, and can also prevent the release of unstable reaction intermediates. Although a wide variety of metabolic pathways involve enzymes that are tightly bound to each other, others may involve more loosely associated complexes that are very difficult to study outside the cell. Consequently, the importance of these complexes for metabolism in general remains unclear.

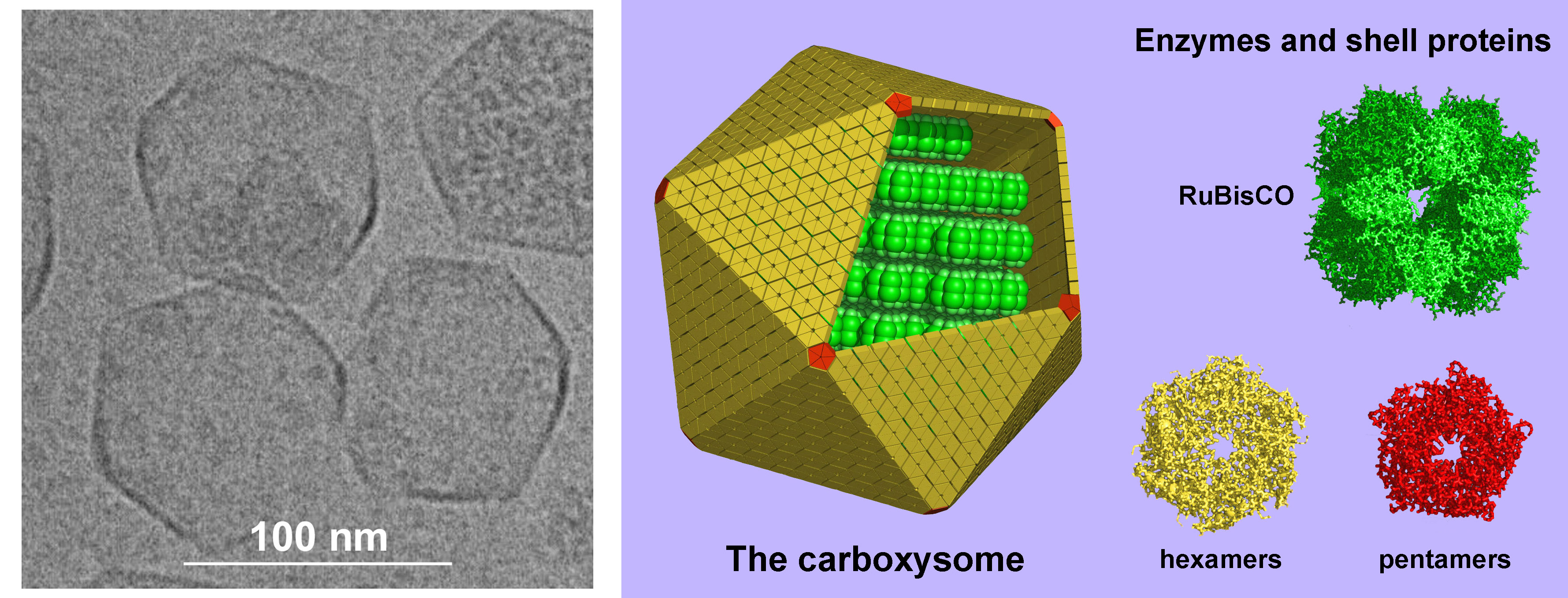
Carboxysomes are protein-enclosed bacterial microcompartments within the cytosol. On the left is an electron microscope image of carboxysomes, and on the right a model of their structure.

=== Protein compartments ===
Some protein complexes contain a large central cavity that is isolated from the remainder of the cytosol. One example of such an enclosed compartment is the proteasome. Here, a set of subunits form a hollow barrel containing proteases that degrade cytosolic proteins. Since these would be damaging if they mixed freely with the remainder of the cytosol, the barrel is capped by a set of regulatory proteins that recognize proteins with a signal directing them for degradation (a ubiquitin tag) and feed them into the proteolytic cavity.

Another large class of protein compartments are bacterial microcompartments, which are made of a protein shell that encapsulates various enzymes. These compartments are typically about 100–200 nanometres across and made of interlocking proteins. A well-understood example is the carboxysome, which contains enzymes involved in carbon fixation such as RuBisCO.

=== Biomolecular condensates ===
Non-membrane bound organelles can form as biomolecular condensates, which arise by clustering, oligomerisation, or polymerisation of macromolecules to drive colloidal phase separation of the cytoplasm or nucleus.

=== Cytoskeletal sieving ===
Although the cytoskeleton is not part of the cytosol, the presence of this network of filaments restricts the diffusion of large particles in the cell. For example, in several studies tracer particles larger than about 25 nanometres (about the size of a ribosome) were excluded from parts of the cytosol around the edges of the cell and next to the nucleus. These "excluding compartments" may contain a much denser meshwork of actin fibres than the remainder of the cytosol. These microdomains could influence the distribution of large structures such as ribosomes and organelles within the cytosol by excluding them from some areas and concentrating them in others.

== Function ==
The cytosol is the site of multiple cell processes. Examples of these processes include signal transduction from the cell membrane to sites within the cell, such as the cell nucleus, or other organelles. This compartment is also the site of many of the processes of cytokinesis, after the breakdown of the nuclear membrane in mitosis. Another major function of cytosol is to transport metabolites from their site of production to where they are used. This is relatively simple for water-soluble molecules, such as amino acids, which can diffuse rapidly through the cytosol. However, hydrophobic molecules, such as fatty acids or sterols, can be transported through the cytosol by specific binding proteins, which shuttle these molecules between cell membranes. Molecules taken into the cell by endocytosis or on their way to be secreted can also be transported through the cytosol inside vesicles, which are small spheres of lipids that are moved along the cytoskeleton by motor proteins.

The cytosol is the site of most metabolism in prokaryotes, and a large proportion of the metabolism of eukaryotes. For instance, in mammals about half of the proteins in the cell are localized to the cytosol. The most complete data are available in yeast, where metabolic reconstructions indicate that the majority of both metabolic processes and metabolites occur in the cytosol. Major metabolic pathways that occur in the cytosol in animals are protein biosynthesis, the pentose phosphate pathway, glycolysis and gluconeogenesis. The localization of pathways can be different in other organisms, for instance fatty acid synthesis occurs in chloroplasts in plants and in apicoplasts in apicomplexa.
