= Extremophiles in biotechnology =

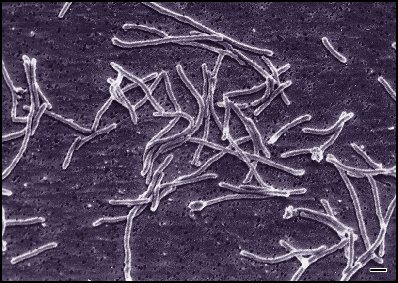
Thermus aquaticus. The thermophilic bacteria found in thermal lakes that Taq Polymerase was isolated from.

Extremophiles in biotechnology is the application of organisms that thrive in extreme environments to biotechnology.

Extremophiles are organisms that thrive in the most volatile environments on the planet and due to their talents, they have begun playing a large role in biotechnology. These organisms live everywhere from environments of high acidity or salinity to areas with limited or no oxygen. Scientists show keen interest in organisms with rare or strange talents and in the past 20-30 years extremophiles have been at the forefront with thousands of researchers delving into their abilities. The area in which there has been the most talk, research, and development in relation to these organisms is biotechnology.

Scientists around the globe are either extracting DNA to modify genomes or directly using extremophiles to complete tasks. Thanks to the discovery and interest in these organisms the enzymes used in polymerase chain reaction (PCR) were found, making the rapid replication of DNA in the lab possible. Since they gained the spotlight researchers have been amassing databases of genome data for the hopes that new traits and abilities can be used to further biotechnical advancements. Everything from the biodegradation of waste to the production of new fuels is on the horizon with the developments made in the field of biotechnology. There are many different kinds of extremophiles with each kind favoring a different environment. These organisms have become more and more important to biotechnology as their genomes have been uncovered, revealing a plethora of genetic potential. Currently the main uses of extremophiles lies in processes such as PCR, biofuel generation and biomining, but there are many other smaller scale operations at play. There are also labs that have identified what they wish to do with extremophiles, but haven't been able to fully achieve their goals. While these large scale goals have not yet been met the scientific community is working towards their completion in hope of creating new technologies and processes.

== Overview of extremophiles ==
Extremophile is the term that covers a large group of organisms, most prominently Archaeans, which have evolved to fill the niches of extremely inhospitable environments. Such environments include high or low temperatures, high levels of salinity, high or low pH levels, and areas where volatile chemicals are prominent. These organisms have made some of the most undesirable locations on the planet their home. A few examples of these locations include thermal vents at the bottom of the ocean, soda lakes, runoffs from chemical factories and the trash heaps of landfills.

There are 4 major types of extremophiles:

=== Thermophiles ===
Thermophilic extremophiles live in areas of extreme heat with the best example being geothermal vents at the bottom of the ocean. The benefit of these organisms lies in the polymers and enzymes produced within them as they are highly thermostable.

=== Halophiles ===
Halophilic extremophiles live in areas of high salinity such as solar salterns and soda lakes. Their ability to consume and thrive in areas of such salinity open up possible benefits such as inoculating crops in salt rich soils to help them grow. Another use found for them lies in their production of polymers used to make biodegradable plastics.

=== Methanogens ===
Methanogenic extremophiles live just about anywhere and are the most widespread. These organisms take various simple organic compounds and use them to synthesize methane as their source of energy. There are no other known organisms that use the synthesis of methane as a form of energy production.

=== Psychrophiles ===
Psychrophilic extremophiles have the ability to maintain high growth rates and enzyme activity at temperatures even as low as 0°C. This presents the possibility of utilizing enzymes found in these organisms in parallel to how thermophilic organism enzymes are used, but at low temperatures as opposed to high temperatures.

Having the ability to live in such harsh environment comes from the organisms traits and abilities that are coded into their genomes. Changes inherited over time via DNA have allowed these organisms to build up various resistances and immunities to the volatile nature of their homes. It is these traits that have scientists so fixated on extremophiles because the genes that allow for said abilities can be taken from extremophiles and used in various biotechnical processes. A good example of this would be how Taq Polymerase was isolated from the bacteria Thermus aquaticus and was then used to make the process of PCR possible. In some cases even the entire organism can be utilized due to how it functions in nature. A good example of this would be the use of methanogenic extremophiles to assist in the decomposition of waste. While only four major types of extremophiles are listed above, there are many more types that are not mentioned in this article.

== Importance ==
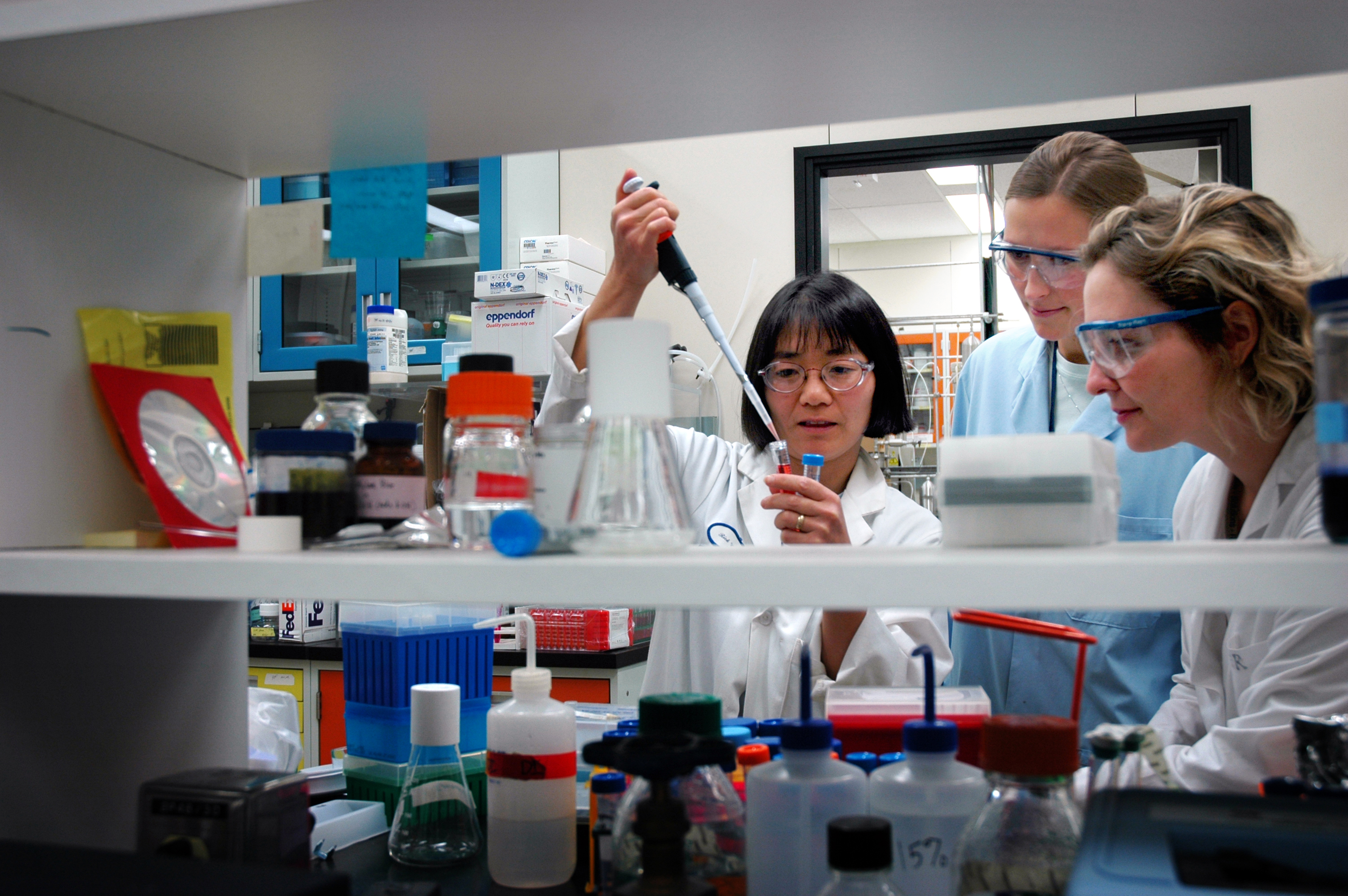
Scientists at a biotechnical laboratory synthesizing DNA.

A great deal of biological and chemical processes undertaken in laboratories take great stretches of time, are extremely delicate and tend to be costly. This is due to the fact that general biological enzymes, proteins and other various organic compounds have very specific requirements for them to function properly. These are generally moderate conditions and therefore are known as mesophilic. Catalysts that involve changes in temperature, salinity, or acidity can impact the mesophilic organic compounds and products within a given process which in turn negatively affects the outcome. To deal with this, scientists in the past had to use longer experimental pathways to meet the moderate conditions. This, as stated previously, extends the time it takes to perform experiments and processes as well as increases costs.

To overcome this issue scientists have turned to extremophiles due to their natural abilities to handle extreme conditions. These abilities are linked to genes which can be isolated, extracted and replicated in the lab. With this, the genetic information can then be implanted in the given enzymes, polymers, proteases and other various organic compounds to give them desired resistance. This allows for biological and chemical processes to be completed rapidly as the careful, long winded strategies can be bypassed. Extremophiles, both themselves and their DNA, are helping scientists to optimize lengthy research techniques and processes.

== Applications ==
=== PCR ===
The polymerase chain reaction (PCR) was developed in the 1980s by Kary Mullis. Mullis would later receive the Nobel Prize for his creation of this process in 1993. PCR uses one of the heat resistant enzymes found in the thermophile T. aquaticus to rapidly and efficiently make copies of specific strands of DNA. The small sample of the target DNA is added to a test tube along with DNA primers, DNA nucleotides, Taq polymerase, and a buffer solution. Once these five key parts are combined they can be put into a PCR thermocycler. In this device the mixture is exposed to a series of temperatures over and over again cycling between 94-95°C, 50-56°C, and 72°C. These three stages are known as the denaturing, annealing and extending stages. During the denaturing stage at 94-95°C the DNA chains separate allowing for new bonds to be made. Then during the annealing stage from 50-56°C primers attach to the single strands of DNA to prepare them for replication. Finally, the extending stage at 72°C the strands of DNA replicate as they would naturally as the DNA nucleotides are added reforming the double stranded helix. These stages are cycled through multiple times until the desired amount of DNA is obtained. Without the enzyme produced by T. aquaticus, Taq polymerase, this process would not be possible as the components would normally denature at such high temperatures.

=== Biofuel production ===
Fuels play a large part in everyday life in everything from driving a car and heating homes to large scale industrial processes and heavy machinery. As natural gases and fuels are being used up scientists have focused their gaze on possible replacements for said fuels. One way in which this is being done is through the utilization of various methanogenic and thermophilic strains of bacteria. These extremophiles in large quantities are able to take in various substances such as sugars, cellulose, and various waste products to produce methane, butanol and biodiesel. While butanol in high percentages would normally inhibit the growth and function of biological organisms, some bacterial strains, primarily thermophiles, have been engineered to handle butanol even in high concentrations. One of the more recent developments in this area is the discovery of extremophile strains of algae which can be used to produce biodiesel. Cyanidium caldarium is noted as one of the most promising strains due to the high lipid content of the biodiesel products it creates. While this application has not yet widely developed to large scale utilization, scientists working in this field hope to find an efficient and sustainable solution involving extremophiles soon.

=== Biomining ===
Through work with various extremophiles the technique of biomining was developed. Also known as bioleaching, the process involves the use of acidophiles in the removal of insoluble sulfides and oxides from various metals as they are mined from the earth. The normal process of heap leaching involves mixing mined metals with highly volatile chemicals such as cyanide. The process of bioleaching is noted as a safer approach to the mining process. Along with this it is also much better for the environment. With heap leaching comes the possibility of runoff and spills that would poison the environment as it seeps into the ground. With biomining this worry is reduced as the conditions can be easily maintained using thermophilic and acidophilic strains of bacteria. Not only has this process been noted as safer and more environmentally friendly, but is also able to extract more metal. Heap leaching has about a 60% extraction rate while bioleaching has seen rates up to 90%. So far gold, silver, copper, zinc, nickel, and uranium have been mined successfully using this process.

These three examples listed above are a few of the primary applications of extremophiles in biotechnology, but they are not the only ones. Other various applications that will not be fully described here include: carotenoid production, protease/lipase production, Glycosyl hydrolase production and sugar production. These secondary applications focus on the production of biological compounds that can be used within primary applications such as those listed above.

== Future developments ==
Thanks to the increased interest in extremophiles the revolutionary technique of PCR was pioneered and brought the field of DNA study to the next level. Following this trend scientists in both biotech and industry want to push farther and find new ways to impact the scientific community. One way that is currently being studied is the production of plastics by halophilic extremophiles so that modern day oil-based plastics can become a thing of the past. This would bring biodegradable plastics to the world market, which in the long run is proposed as a way to help fight the world's garbage problem. Another advancement that scientists hope to make using these organisms is to increase the degradation of landfills around the world using methanogenic species that thrive on the organic compounds found there. Not only would this reduce waste, but the methane produced is hoped to be collected and used as an energy source. One other interesting future development lies in the field of medicine. Some biotechnical labs are looking into using extremophiles engineered to produce portions of viruses on their surface to elicit immune system responses. This would help train immune memory and antibody response to defend the body in case said virus ever attacks. While this is just a handful of examples there are many more advancements and developments being worked on using extremophiles in hopes of creating a better future.
