= Encapsulin nanocompartment =

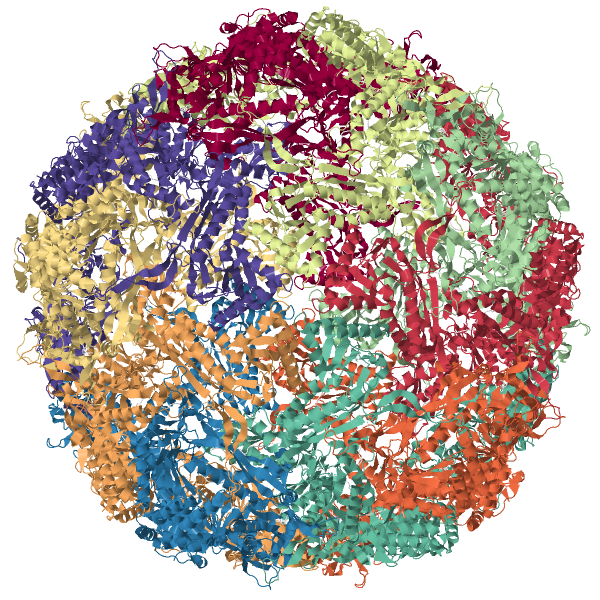
Crystal structure of Thermotoga maritima encapsulin. PDB entry 3dkt

Encapsulin nanocompartments, or encapsulin protein cages, are spherical bacterial organelle-like compartments roughly 25-30 nm in diameter that are involved in various aspects of metabolism, in particular protecting bacteria from oxidative stress. Encapsulin nanocompartments are structurally similar to the HK97 bacteriophage and their function depends on the proteins loaded into the nanocompartment. The sphere is formed from 60 (for a 25 nm sphere) or 180 (for a 30 nm sphere) copies of a single protomer, termed encapsulin. Their structure has been studied in great detail using X-ray crystallography and cryo-electron microscopy.

A number of different types of proteins have been identified as being loaded into encapsulin nanocompartments. Peroxidases or proteins similar to ferritins are the two most common types of cargo proteins. While most encapsulin nanocompartments contain only one type of cargo protein, in some species two or three types of cargo proteins are loaded.

Encapsulins purified from Rhodococcus jostii can be assembled and disassembled with changes in pH. In the assembled state, the compartment enhances the activity of its cargo, a peroxidase enzyme.

== Use as a platform for bioengineering ==
Recently, encapsulin nanocompartments have begun to receive considerable interest from bioengineers because of their potential to allow the targeted delivery of drugs, proteins, and mRNAs to specific cells of interest.
