= Cell (biology) =

Basic unit of life forms

- Diagram of typical generalised human cell (eukaryotic)

- A eukaryotic cell as in animals (left) compared to a prokaryotic cell as in bacteria (right)

Identifiers
- MeSH: D002477
- TH: H1.00.01.0.00001
- FMA: 686465

The cell is the basic structural and functional unit of all forms of life or organisms. The term comes from the Latin word cellula meaning 'small room'. A biological cell basically consists of a semipermeable cell membrane enclosing cytoplasm that contains genetic material. Most cells are only visible under a microscope. Except for highly-differentiated cell types (examples include red blood cells and gametes) most cells are capable of replication, and protein synthesis. Some types of cell are motile. Cells emerged on Earth about four billion years ago.

All organisms are grouped into prokaryotes and eukaryotes. Prokaryotes are single-celled and include archaea and bacteria. Eukaryotes can be single-celled or multicellular. Single-celled eukaryotes include most protists, some species of fungi (yeasts), and some species of algae. Multicellular eukaryotes include animals, plants, some species of fungi, and some species of algae. All multicellular organisms are made up of many different types of cell. The diploid cells that make up the body of an animal or plant are known as somatic cells, which excludes the haploid gametes.

Prokaryotes lack a membrane-bound nucleus and have a nucleoid instead. In eukaryotic cells, the nucleus is enclosed in the nuclear membrane. Eukaryotic cells contain other membrane-bound organelles such as mitochondria, which provide energy for cell functions, and chloroplasts, in plants that create sugars by photosynthesis. Other membrane-less organelles may be proteinaceous, such as the ribosomes present (though different) in both groups. A unique membrane-bound prokaryotic organelle, the magnetosome has been discovered in magnetotactic bacteria.

Cells were discovered by Robert Hooke in 1665, who named them after their resemblance to cells in a monastery. Cell theory was developed through the work of Matthias Jakob Schleiden in 1838 and Theodor Schwann in 1839, who established the cell as the basic structural unit of plants and animals. It states that all organisms are composed of one or more cells, that cells are the fundamental unit of structure and function in all organisms, and that all cells come from pre-existing cells.

== Types ==
Organisms are broadly grouped into eukaryotes and prokaryotes. Eukaryotic cells possess a membrane-bound nucleus, and prokaryotic cells lack a nucleus but have a nucleoid region. Prokaryotes are single-celled organisms, whereas eukaryotes can be either single-celled or multicellular. Single-celled eukaryotes include microalgae such as diatoms, and some yeasts , species of fungi. Multicellular eukaryotes include all animals, and plants, most fungi, and some species of algae.

Property	Archaea	Bacteria	Eukaryota
Cell membrane	Ether-linked lipids	Ester-linked lipids	Ester-linked lipids
Cell wall	Glycoprotein, or S-layer; rarely pseudopeptidoglycan	Peptidoglycan, S-layer, or no cell wall	Various structures; animal cells lack a cell wall
Gene structure	Circular chromosomes, similar translation and transcription to Eukaryota	Circular chromosomes, unique translation and transcription	Multiple, linear chromosomes, but translation and transcription similar to Archaea
Internal cell structure	No nucleus; rarely has membrane-bound organelles	No nucleus, has a few membrane-bound prokaryotic organelles	Has nucleus and other membrane-bound organelles
Metabolism	Various, including diazotrophy, with methanogenesis unique to Archaea	Various, including photosynthesis, aerobic and anaerobic respiration, fermentation, diazotrophy, and autotrophy	Photosynthesis, cellular respiration, and fermentation; no diazotrophy
Reproduction	Asexual reproduction, horizontal gene transfer	Asexual reproduction, horizontal gene transfer	Sexual and asexual reproduction
Protein synthesis initiation	Methionine	Formylmethionine	Methionine
RNA polymerase	One	One	Many
EF-2/EF-G	Sensitive to diphtheria toxin	Resistant to diphtheria toxin	Sensitive to diphtheria toxin

=== Prokaryotes ===
Structure of a typical bacterial cell, generally similar to the archaeal cell structure. The bacterial flagellum shown, differs from the archaellum in archaea

Bacteria and archaea divide by binary fission

All prokaryotes are single-celled and include bacteria and archaea, two of the three domains of life. Prokaryotic cells were likely the first form of life on Earth, characterized by having vital biological processes including cell signaling. They are simpler and smaller than eukaryotic cells, lack a nucleus, and the other usually present membrane-bound organelles. Prokaryotic organelles are less complex, and are typically membrane-less. All prokaryotic cells secrete different substances from their membranes, including exoenzymes, and extracellular polymeric substances.

Most prokaryotes are the smallest of all organisms, ranging from 0.1 to 5.0 μm in diameter. The largest bacterium known, Thiomargarita magnifica, is visible to the naked eye with an average length of 1 cm, but can reach 2 cm.

==== Bacteria ====
Bacteria are enclosed in a cell envelope, that protects the interior from the exterior. It generally consists of a plasma membrane covered by a cell wall which, for some bacteria, is covered by a third layer, a gelatinous bacterial capsule. The capsule may be polysaccharide as in pneumococci, meningococci or polypeptide as Bacillus anthracis or hyaluronic acid as in streptococci. Mycoplasma only possess the cell membrane. The cell envelope gives rigidity to the cell and separates the interior of the cell from its environment, serving as a protective mechanical and chemical filter. The cell wall consists of peptidoglycan and acts as an additional barrier against exterior forces. The cell wall acts to protect the cell mechanically and chemically from its environment, and is an additional layer of protection to the cell membrane. It also prevents the cell from expanding and bursting (cytolysis) from osmotic pressure due to a hypotonic environment.

The DNA of a bacterium typically consists of a single circular chromosome that is in direct contact with the cytoplasm in a region called the nucleoid. Some bacteria contain multiple circular or even linear chromosomes. The cytoplasm also contains ribosomes and various inclusions where transcription takes place alongside translation. Extrachromosomal DNA as plasmids, are usually circular and encode additional genes, such as those of antibiotic resistance. Linear bacterial plasmids have been identified in several species of spirochete bacteria, including species of Borrelia which causes Lyme disease. The prokaryotic cytoskeleton in bacteria is involved in the maintenance of cell shape, polarity and cytokinesis.

Compartmentalization is a key feature of eukaryotic cells but some species of bacteria, have protein-based organelle-like microcompartments such as gas vesicles, and carboxysomes, and encapsulin nanocompartments. Certain membrane-bound prokaryotic organelles have also been discovered. They include the magnetosome of magnetotactic bacteria, and the anammoxosome of anammox bacteria.

Cell-surface appendages can include flagella, and pili, protein structures that facilitate movement and communication between cells. The flagellum stretches from the cytoplasm through the cell membrane and extrudes through the cell wall. Fimbriae are short attachment pili, the other type of pilus is the longer conjugative type. Fimbriae are formed of an antigenic protein called pilin, and are responsible for the attachment of bacteria to specific receptors on host cells.

==== Archaea ====
Archaea are enclosed in a cell envelope consisting of a plasma membrane and a cell wall. An exception to this is the Thermoplasma that only has the cell membrane. The cell membranes of archaea are unique, consisting of ether-linked lipids. The prokaryotic cytoskeleton has homologues of eukaryotic actin and tubulin. A unique form of metabolism in the archaean is methanogenesis. Their cell-surface appendage equivalent of the flagella is the differently structured and unique archaellum. The DNA is contained in a circular chromosome in direct contact with the cytoplasm, in a region known as the nucleoid. Ribosomes are also found freely in the cytoplasm, or attached to the cell membrane where DNA processing takes place.

The archaea are noted for their extremophile species, and many are selectively evolved to thrive in conditions of extreme heat, cold, acidity, alkalinity, or high salt. There are no known archaean pathogens.

=== Eukaryotes ===
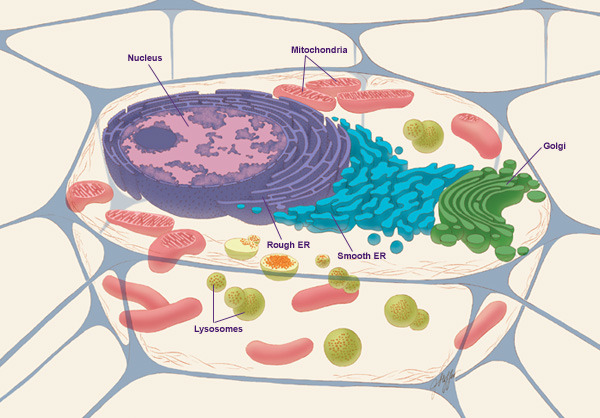
Diagram of a typical generalized eukaryotic cell

A eukaryotic cell can be 2 to 100 times larger in diameter than a typical prokaryotic cell. Eukaryotes can be single-celled, as in diatoms (microscopic algae), or microfungi such as yeasts, or multicellular, as in animals, plants, most fungi, and seaweed (macroalgae). Multicellular organisms are made up of many different types of cell known overall as somatic cells. Eukaryotes are distinguished by the presence of a membrane-bound nucleus that gives the eukaryote its name, which means "true nut" or "true kernel", where "nut" means the nucleus.

The nucleus is the largest membrane-bound organelle in the eukaryotic cell. Other organelles present in all eukaryotic cells are the endoplasmic reticulum, ribosomes, the Golgi apparatus, mitochondria, lysosomes, peroxisomes, endosomes, and vesicles. The contents of the cell are contained within a cell membrane, and together with all the membranes of the organelles (except the mitochondria) are known as the endomembrane system. All of these membranes are involved in the secretory and endocytic pathways, modifying, packaging, and transporting proteins and lipids to and from the trans Golgi network. In mammalian cells, endocytosis includes early, late, and recycling endosomes.

Some eukaryotes cells including plant cells and fungi have a cell wall. Plastids including chloroplasts feature mainly in plant cells. Most cell types include vaults. There are many cell variations among the different eukaryote groups. Many cells project one or more cellular extensions. And some organelles also project extensions such as stromules from plastids in plant cells, peroxules from peroxisomes, and matrixules from mitochondria.

Most distinct cell types arise from a single totipotent cell, called a zygote, that differentiates into hundreds of different cell types during the course of development. Differentiation of cells is driven by different environmental cues (such as cell–cell interaction) and intrinsic differences (such as those caused by the uneven distribution of molecules during division).

Eukaryotic cell types include those that make up animals, plants, fungi, algae, and protists. All of which have many different species and cell differences. A separate grouping of animals and fungi are known as opisthokonts.

==== Structure ====
A eukaryotic cell has a cell membrane that surrounds a gel-like cytoplasm. The cytoplasm contains the cytoskeleton, the cell nucleus, the endoplasmic reticulum, ribosomes, the Golgi apparatus, mitochondria, peroxisomes, endosomes, vacuoles and vesicles, and vaults. A eukaryotic cell structure, includes an endomembrane system encompassing the cell membrane, and all the membranes of the organelles excluding those of the mitochondria. The whole system cooperates in the modification, packaging, and transport of proteins and lipids.

===== Cell membrane =====
Diagram of cell membrane detailing the lipid bilayer

Diagram of cell membrane detailing membrane proteins

The cell membrane, or plasma membrane, is a selectively permeable membrane as an outer boundary of the cell that encloses the cytoplasm. Underlying, and attached to the cell membrane is the cell cortex, the outermost part of the actin cytoskeleton. The membrane serves to separate and protect a cell from its surrounding environment and is made mostly from a lipid bilayer of phospholipids, which are amphiphilic (partly hydrophobic and partly hydrophilic). It has been best described in the fluid mosaic model.

Embedded within the cell membrane are secretory macromolecular lipoprotein structures called porosomes; and a number of different channels and pumps involved in actively transporting molecules into and out of the cell. The membrane is semi-permeable, and selectively permeable, in that it can either let a substance (molecule or ion) pass through freely, to a limited extent or not at all. Cell surface receptors in the membrane allow cells to detect external signaling molecules such as hormones.

===== Cytoplasm =====
The cell membrane encloses the cytoplasm of the cell that surrounds all of the cell's organelles. It is made up of two main components, the cytoskeleton made up of protein filaments, and the cytosol. The network of filaments and microtubules of the cytoskeleton gives shape and support to the cell, and has a part in organising the cell components.

The cytosol is a gel-like substance made up of water, ions, and non-essential biomolecules, and is the main site of protein synthesis, and degradation. The acidity (pH) of the cytosol is near neutral, and is regulated by transporters in the cell membrane. Different proteins in the cytoplasm operate optimally at different pHs. The cytosol forms 30%–50% of the cell's volume.

===== Cytoskeleton =====
The cytoskeleton acts to organize and maintain the cell's shape; anchors organelles in place; helps during endocytosis, and in the uptake of external materials by a cell. The cytoskeleton is composed of microtubules, intermediate filaments and microfilaments. There are a great number of proteins associated with them, each controlling a cell's structure by directing, bundling, and aligning filaments. The outermost part of the cytoskeleton is the cell cortex, or actin cortex, a thin layer of cross-linked actomyosins. Its thickness varies with cell type and physiology. It directs the transport through the ER and the Golgi apparatus. The cytoskeleton in the animal cell also plays a part in cytokinesis, in the formation of the spindle apparatus during cell division, the separation of daughter cells.

===== Organelles =====
Organelles are compartments of the cell that are specialized for carrying out one or more functions, analogous to the organs, such as the heart, and lungs. There are several types of organelles held in the cytoplasm. Most organelles are membrane-bound, and vary in size and number based on the growth of the host cell. Organelles include the nucleus, mitochondria, endoplasmic reticulum, Golgi apparatus, lysosomes, peroxisomes, vesicles, and vacuoles. Membrane-less organelles include the nucleolus in the nucleus, centrosomes, ribosomes, proteasomes, and vaults.

===== Nucleus =====
Diagram of the nucleus showing the ribosome-studded outer nuclear membrane, nuclear pores, DNA (complexed as chromatin), and the nucleolus.

Diagram of DNA structure

The cell nucleus is the largest organelle in the animal cells and many other eukaryotic cells. It houses the cell's chromosomes, and is the place where almost all DNA replication and RNA synthesis (transcription) occur. The nucleus is spherical and separated from the cytoplasm by a double-membraned nuclear envelope. A space between the membranes is called the perinuclear space. The nuclear envelope isolates and protects a cell's DNA from various molecules that could accidentally damage its structure or interfere with its processing. During processing, DNA is transcribed, or copied into a special RNA, called messenger RNA (mRNA). This mRNA is then transported out of the nucleus, where it is translated into a specific protein molecule. The nucleolus is a specialized biomolecular condensate within the nucleus where ribosome subunits are assembled. It is one of several types of membrane-less nuclear bodies. Cells use DNA for their long-term information storage that is encoded in its DNA sequence. RNA is used for information transport (e.g., mRNA) and enzymatic functions (e.g., ribosomal RNA). Transfer RNA (tRNA) molecules are used to add amino acids during protein translation.

The DNA of each cell is its genetic material, and is organized in multiple linear molecules, called chromosomes, that are coiled around histone proteins and housed in the cell nucleus. In humans, the nuclear genome is divided into 46 linear chromosomes, including 22 homologous chromosome pairs and a pair of sex chromosomes. The nucleus is a membrane-bound organelle.

===== Endoplasmic reticulum =====
The endoplasmic reticulum (ER) is a transport network for molecules targeted for certain modifications and specific destinations, as compared to molecules that float freely in the cytoplasm. The ER has two forms: the rough endoplasmic reticulum (RER), which has ribosomes on its surface that secrete proteins into the ER, and the smooth endoplasmic reticulum (SER), which lacks ribosomes. The smooth ER plays a role in calcium sequestration and release, and helps in synthesis of lipid.

===== Golgi apparatus =====
The Golgi apparatus processes and packages proteins, and lipids, that are synthesized by the cell. It is organized as a stack of plate-like structures known as cisternae.

===== Mitochondria =====
Mitochondria are self-replicating double membrane-bound organelles that occur in various numbers, shapes, and sizes in the cytoplasm of the cell. Aerobic respiration in the mitochondria generates the cell's energy by oxidative phosphorylation, using oxygen to release energy stored in cellular nutrients (typically pertaining to glucose) to generate adenosine triphosphate (ATP). Mitochondria are descended from bacteria that formed an endosymbiotic relationship with ancient prokaryotes. Mitochondria multiply by binary fission and have their own DNA contained in multiple small circular chromosomes. The mitochondrial DNA (mtDNA) is very small compared to nuclear DNA, but it codes for 13 proteins involved in mitochondrial energy production and specific transfer RNAs (tRNAs). Mitochondria also have their own ribosomes known as mitoribosomes.

===== Lysosomes =====
A lysosome is the most acidic compartment in the cell. It contains over 60 different hydrolytic enzymes that need an acidic environment. They digest excess or worn-out organelles, food particles, and engulfed viruses or bacteria. The cell could not house these destructive enzymes if they were not contained in a membrane-bound compartment.

===== Peroxisomes =====
Peroxisomes are microbodies bounded by a single membrane. A peroxisome has no DNA or ribosomes and the proteins that it needs are encoded in the nucleus, and selectively imported from the cytosol. Some proteins enter via the endomembrane reticulum. They have enzymes that rid the cell of toxic peroxides. The enzymatic content of the peroxisomes varies widely across the species, as it can in an individual organism. The peroxisomes in animal cells are concentrated in the liver cells and adipocytes.

===== Vacuoles =====
Vacuoles sequester waste products. Some cells, most notably Amoeba, have contractile vacuoles, which can pump water out of the cell if there is too much water.

===== Ribosomes =====
A ribosome is a large complex of RNA and protein molecules considered as a membrane-less organelle when freely found in the cytosol, or as a membrane-bound organelle when located in the rough type of endoplasmic reticulum. They each consist of two subunits, one larger than the other, and act as an assembly line where messenger RNA from the nucleus is used to synthesise proteins from amino acids.

===== Vaults =====
A vault is a large ribonuclear protein particle, a membrane-less organelle, three times the size of a ribosome but with only three proteins in contrast to the near hundred in the ribosome. Most human cells have around 10,000 vaults, and in some types of immune cell there may be up to 100,000. Macrophages have the greatest number of vaults of any human cell. Vaults are largely overlooked because their functions are purely speculative. They may play a role in transport from the nucleus to the cytoplasm, and may serve as scaffolds for signal transduction proteins. They are present in normal tissues, and more so in secretory and excretory epithelial cells.

===== Proteasome =====
Proteasomes are intricate membrane-less protein complexes responsible for the degradation of regulatory proteins, and damaged proteins in the cytosol and nucleus. They also function in protein homeostasis, stress response, and in the control of cell division and signal transduction.

=== Animal cells ===
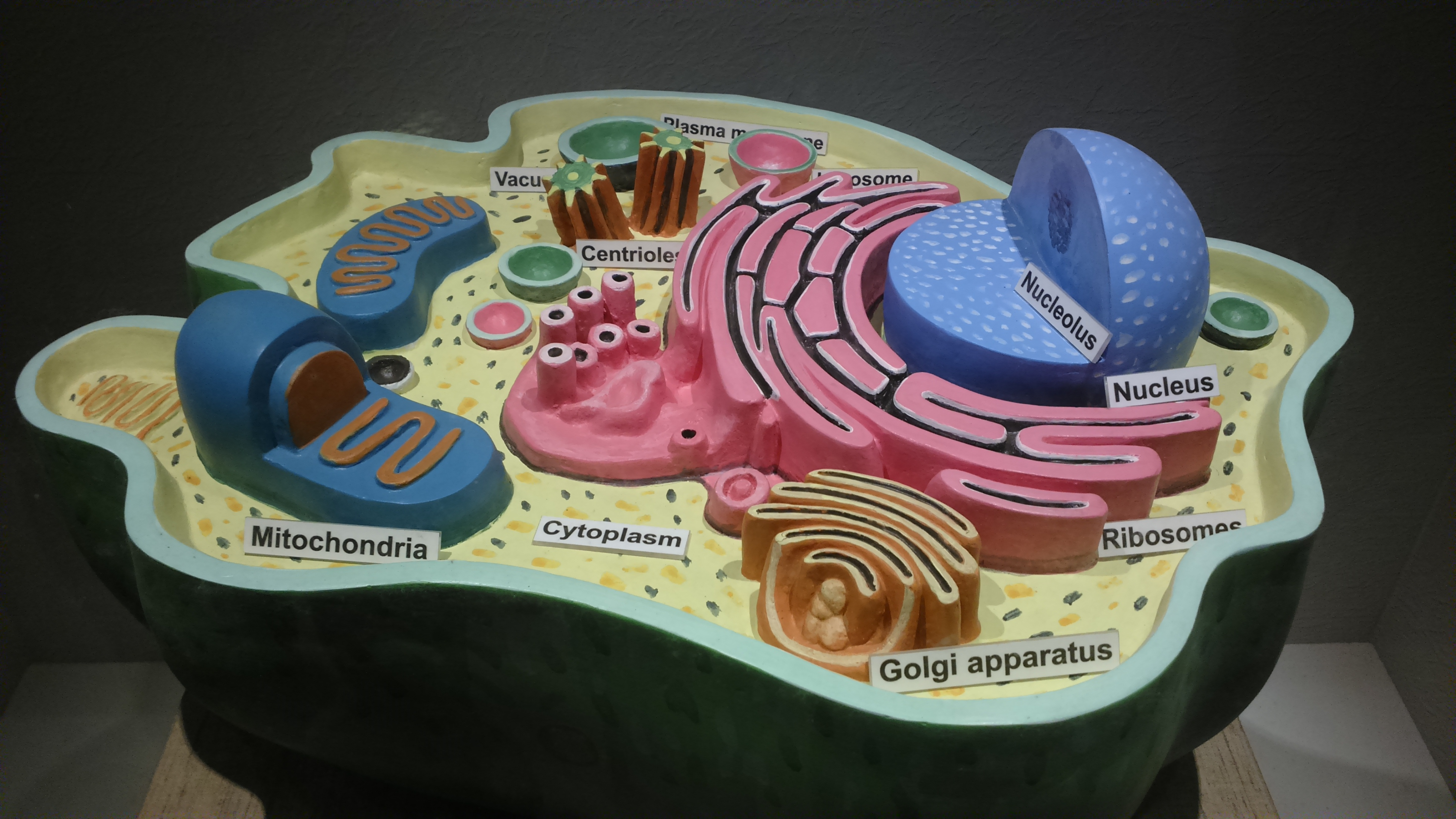
Structure of an animal cell

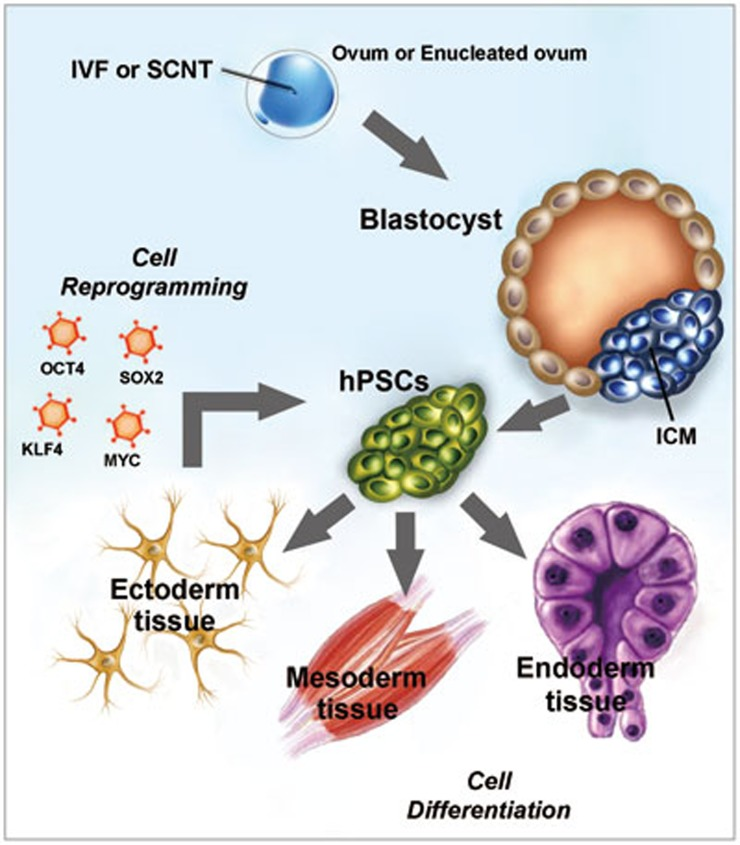
Post-translational modifications as cell reprogramming involved in the differentiation of human pluripotent stem cells (hPSCs). (ICM - inner cell mass)

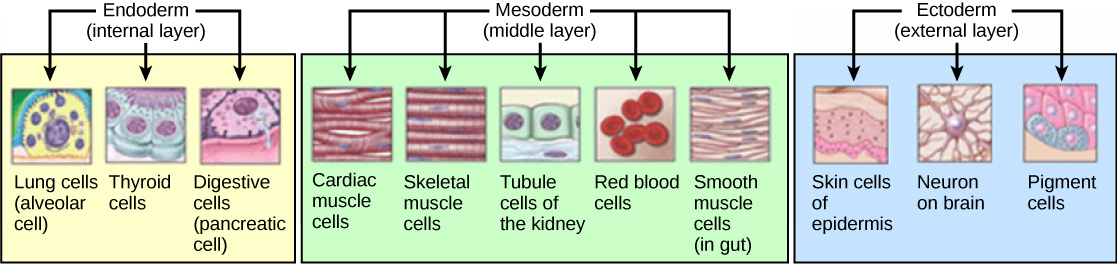
Cells from the germ layers

All the cells in an animal body develop from one totipotent diploid cell called a zygote. During the embryonic development of an animal, the cells differentiate into the specialised tissues and organs of the organism. Different groups of cells differentiate from the germ layers. The sponge has only one layer. Some other animals known as diploblasts have two germ layers the ectoderm, and the endoderm. More advanced animals have an extra layer, the middle mesodermal layer, and are known as triploblastic. Triploblastic animals make up the large clade of Bilateria. Differentiation results in structural or functional changes to stem cells, and progenitor cells.

The ectoderm gives rise to several different types of epithelial tissues including the skin, and glands, and to the nervous tissue. Epithelium as mesothelium forms the lining of many organs, and inner cavities. Epithelial cells are joined in sheets by way of cell junctions; adherens junctions, and desmosomes bind the cells together, and hemidesmosomes bind the cells to the basement membrane. All three types are linked to the cell cytoskeleton.

There are an estimated 200 different cell types in the human body. The estimated cell count in a typical adult human body is around 30 trillion cells, 36 trillion in an adult male, and 28 trillion in a female.

==== Structure ====
Like other eukaryotic cells, animal cells are made up of a cell membrane containing a gel like cytoplasm. In this cytoplasm are a variety of membrane organelles, including all the shared eukaryotic organelles: the cell nucleus, the endoplasmic reticulum, ribosomes, the Golgi apparatus, mitochondria, peroxisomes, endosomes, vacuoles and vesicles, and vaults; as well as centrosomes, which are unique to animal cells.

===== Centrosome =====
The centrosome is a membrane-less organelle composed of pericentriolar material and the two centrioles. The centrosome is the main microtubule organizing center in the animal cell that produces the microtubules key components of the cytoskeleton. Centrosomes are composed of two centrioles which lie perpendicular to each other in which each has an organization like a cartwheel, which separate during cell division and help in the formation of the mitotic spindle. While most other eukaryotes do have centrioles, plants do not and centrosomes are unique to animal cells.

==== Animal cell types ====
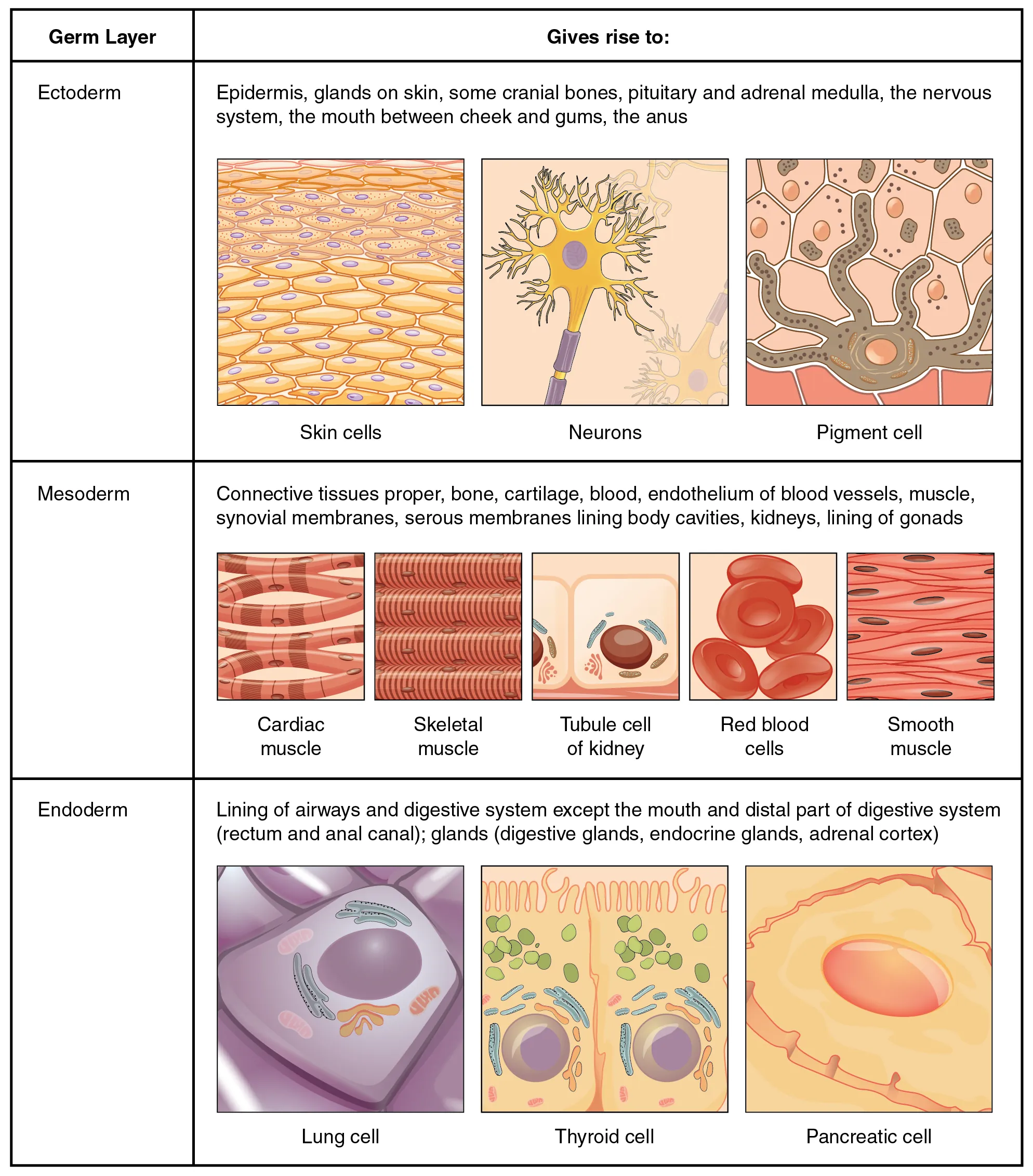
Cells that arise from the three germ layers

Some types of specialized cell are localized to a particular animal group. Vertebrates for example have specialized, structurally changed cells including muscle cells. The cell membrane of a skeletal muscle cell or of a cardiac muscle cell is termed the sarcolemma. And the cytoplasm is termed the sarcoplasm. Skeletal muscle cells also become multinucleated. Populations of animal groups evolve to become distinct species, where sexual reproduction is isolated. The many species of vertebrates for example have other unique characteristics by way of additional specialized cells. In some species of electric fish for example modified muscle cells or nerve cells have specialized to become electerocytes capable of creating and storing electrical energy for future release, as in stunning prey, or use in electrolocation. These are large flat cells in the electric eel, and electric ray in which thousands are stacked into an electric organ comparable to a voltaic pile.

Many animal cells are ciliated and most cells except red blood cells have primary cilia. Primary cilia play important roles in chemosensation and mechanosensation. Each cilium may be "viewed as a sensory cellular antennae that coordinates a large number of cellular signaling pathways, sometimes coupling the signaling to ciliary motility or alternatively to cell division and differentiation." The cilia in other cells are motile organelles, and in the respiratory epithelium play an important role in the movement of mucus. In the reproductive system ciliated epithelium in the fallopian tubes move the egg from the uterus to the ovary. Motile cilia also known as flagella, drive the sperm cells. Invertebrate planarians have ciliated excretory flame cells. Other excretory cells also found in planarians are solenocytes that are long and flagellated.

=== Plant cells ===
Structure of a typical plant cell

Onion (Allium cepa) root cells in different phases of the cell cycle (drawn by E.B. Wilson, 1900)

Plant cells have cell walls composed of cellulose, hemicelluloses, and pectin that are constructed outside the cell membrane. In sclerenchyma tissue lignin is secreted to form a secondary wall inside the primary cell wall. Cutin is secreted outside the primary cell wall and into the outer layers of the secondary cell wall of the epidermal cells of leaves, stems and other above-ground organs to form the plant cuticle. Cell walls perform many essential functions, they provide shape to form the tissue and organs of the plant, and play an important role in intercellular communication and plant-microbe interactions. Specialized cell-to-cell communication pathways known as plasmodesmata, occur in the form of pores in the primary cell wall through which the cell membrane and endoplasmic reticulum of adjacent cells are continuous.

Organelles in plant cells, include pigment-containing plastids, especially chloroplasts that contain chlorophyll (also found in algae), large water-storage vacuoles, and two types of peroxisome. Chloroplasts capture the sun's energy to make carbohydrates through photosynthesis. Chromoplasts contain fat-soluble carotenoid pigments such as orange carotene and yellow xanthophylls which helps in synthesis and storage. Leucoplasts are non-pigmented plastids and helps in storage of nutrients. Plastids divide by binary fission. The vacuoles are larger than those in animal cells, and their membrane transports ions against concentration gradients. One type of peroxisome is in the leaves where it takes part in photorespiration. The other type is in germinating seeds where it takes part in the conversion of fatty acids into sugars for the plant's growth. In this peroxisome type the enzymatic content is so different from other groups that it has an alternative name of glyoxysome. The enzymes are of the glyoxylate cycle.

The plant cytoskeleton is a dynamic structure that has a scaffold of microtubules and microfilaments, but no intermediate filaments. The microtubule organizing center in plant cells is often sited underneath the cell membrane where nucleated microtubules often form sheet-like semi-parallel arrays.

Plant hormones are produced by all plant cells. Different hormones act as signaling molecules to control all aspects of the plant's growth and development including embryogenesis and reproduction, and in pathogen defense.

=== Algal cells ===
Algae members are photoautotrophs able to use photosynthesis to produce energy. In eukaryotes, photosynthesis is made possible by the use of plastids, organelles in the cytoplasm known as chloroplasts.

Photosynthesis is found in both prokaryotic cyanobacteria and multiple clades of eukaryotic algae; red algae, brown algae, and green algae, which are closely related to land plants.

Alginate is a polysaccharide found in the matrix of the cell walls of brown algae, and has many important uses in the food industry, and in pharmacology.

=== Fungal cells ===
The cells of fungi have in addition to the shared eukaryotic organelles a spitzenkörper in their endomembrane system, associated with hyphal tip growth. It is a phase-dark body that is composed of an aggregation of membrane-bound vesicles containing cell wall components, serving as a point of assemblage and release of such components intermediate between the Golgi and the cell membrane. The spitzenkörper is motile and generates new hyphal tip growth as it moves forward.

The cell walls of fungi are uniquely made of a chitin-glucan complex. Chloroplasts are not found in fungal cells, their pigments are instead associated with their cell walls.

=== Protist cells ===
The cells of protists may be bounded only by a cell membrane, or may in addition have a cell wall, or may be covered by a pellicle (in ciliates), a test (in testate amoebae), or a frustule (in diatoms).

Some protists such as amoebae may feed on other organisms and ingest food by phagocytosis. Vacuoles known as phagosomes in the cytoplasm may be used to draw in and incorporate the captured particles. Other types of protists are photoautotrophs, providing themselves with energy by photosynthesis. Most single-celled protists are motile, and generate movement with cilia, flagella, or pseudopodia.

Ciliates have two different sorts of nuclei: a tiny, diploid micronucleus (the "generative nucleus", which carries the germline of the cell), and a large, ampliploid macronucleus (the "vegetative nucleus", which takes care of general cell regulation.

== Cellular processes ==
Prokaryotes divide by binary fission, while eukaryotes divide by mitosis or meiosis.

=== Replication ===
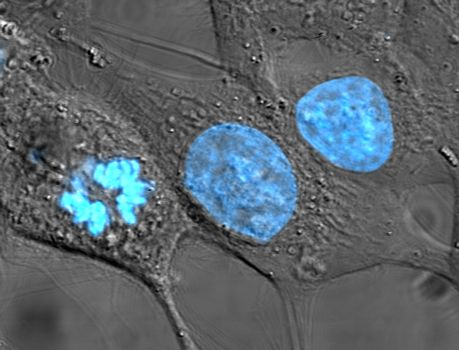
Human cancer cells, specifically HeLa cells, with DNA stained blue. The central and rightmost cell are in interphase, so their DNA is diffuse and the entire nuclei are labelled. The cell on the left is going through mitosis and its chromosomes have condensed.

During cell division, a single cell, the mother cell divides into two daughter cells. This leads to the growth of tissue in multicellular organisms. Prokaryotic cells divide by binary fission, while eukaryotic cells usually undergo a process of nuclear division, called mitosis, followed by division of the cell, called cytokinesis. A diploid cell may undergo meiosis to produce haploid cells, usually four. Haploid cells serve as gametes in multicellular organisms, fusing to form new diploid cells.

DNA replication, or the process of duplicating a cell's genome, always happens when a cell divides through mitosis or binary fission. This occurs during the S (synthesis) phase of the cell cycle.

In meiosis, the DNA is replicated only once, while the cell divides twice. DNA replication only occurs before meiosis I. DNA replication does not occur when the cells divide the second time, in meiosis II. Replication, like all cellular activities, requires specialized proteins.

=== Signaling ===
Cell signaling is the process by which a cell interacts with itself, other cells, and the environment. Typically, the signaling process involves three components: the first messenger (the ligand), the receptor, and the signal itself. Most cell signaling is chemical in nature, and can occur with neighboring cells or more distant targets. Signal receptors are complex proteins or tightly bound multimer of proteins, located in the plasma membrane or within the interior.

Each cell is programmed to respond to specific extracellular signal molecules, and this process is the basis of development, tissue repair, immunity, and homeostasis. Individual cells are able to manage receptor sensitivity including turning them off, and receptors can become less sensitive when they are occupied for long durations. Errors in signaling interactions may cause diseases such as cancer, autoimmunity, and diabetes.

=== Protein targeting ===
Protein targeting or protein sorting is the biological mechanism by which proteins are transported to their appropriate destinations within or outside the cell. Proteins can be targeted to the inner space of an organelle, different intracellular membranes, the plasma membrane, or to the exterior of the cell via secretion. Information contained in the protein itself directs this delivery process. Correct sorting is crucial for the cell; errors or dysfunction in sorting have been linked to multiple diseases.

=== DNA repair ===
All cells contain enzyme systems that scan for DNA damage and carry out repair. Diverse repair processes have evolved in all organisms. Repair is vital to maintain DNA integrity, avoid cell death and errors of replication that could lead to mutation. Repair processes include nucleotide excision repair, DNA mismatch repair, non-homologous end joining of double-strand breaks, recombinational repair and light-dependent repair (photoreactivation).

=== Growth and metabolism ===
Between successive cell divisions, cells grow through the functioning of cellular metabolism. Cell metabolism is the process by which individual cells process nutrient molecules. Metabolism has two distinct divisions: catabolism, in which the cell breaks down complex molecules to produce energy and reducing power, and anabolism, in which the cell uses energy and reducing power to construct complex molecules and perform other biological functions.

Complex sugars can be broken down into simpler sugar molecules called monosaccharides such as glucose. Once inside the cell, glucose is broken down to make adenosine triphosphate (ATP), a molecule that possesses readily available energy, through two different pathways. In plant cells, chloroplasts create sugars by photosynthesis, using the energy of light to join molecules of water and carbon dioxide.

=== Protein synthesis ===
Cells are capable of synthesizing new proteins, which are essential for the modulation and maintenance of cellular activities. This process involves the formation of new protein molecules from amino acid building blocks based on information encoded in DNA/RNA. Protein synthesis generally consists of two major steps: transcription and translation.

Transcription is the process where genetic information in DNA is used to produce a complementary RNA strand. This RNA strand is then processed to give messenger RNA (mRNA), which is free to migrate into the cytoplasm. mRNA molecules bind to protein-RNA complexes called ribosomes located in the cytosol, where they are translated into polypeptide sequences. The ribosome mediates the formation of a polypeptide sequence based on the mRNA sequence. The mRNA sequence directly relates to the polypeptide sequence by binding to transfer RNA (tRNA) adapter molecules in binding pockets within the ribosome. The new polypeptide chain then folds into a functional three-dimensional protein molecule.

=== Motility ===
Unicellular organisms can move in order to find food or escape predators. Common mechanisms of motion include flagella and cilia, and the projection of pseudopodia in amoeboid movement. Cells in multicellular organisms can move during processes such as wound healing, the immune response, and cancer metastasis. In wound healing in animals, white blood cells move to the wound site to kill the pathogens causing infection. Cell motility involves many receptors, crosslinking, bundling, binding, adhesion, motor and other proteins. The process is divided into three steps: protrusion of the leading edge of the cell, adhesion of the leading edge and de-adhesion at the cell body and rear, and cytoskeletal contraction to pull the cell forward. Each step is driven by physical forces generated by unique segments of the cytoskeleton.

==== Navigation, control and communication ====
In August 2020, scientists described one way cells—in particular cells of a slime mold and mouse pancreatic cancer-derived cells—are able to navigate efficiently through a body and identify the best routes through complex mazes: generating gradients after breaking down diffused chemoattractants which enable them to sense upcoming maze junctions before reaching them, including around corners.

=== Cell death ===
Cell death occurs when a cell ceases to carry out its functions, as a result of ageing, or types of cell injury (necrosis). Programmed cell death, including apoptosis, and autophagy is a natural process of replacing dead cells with new ones.

A separate mode of cellular death is known as a mitotic catastrophe, which occurs during mitosis, following the improper progression of, or entrance to the cell cycle. This mechanism operates to prevent genomic instability. Other cell death pathways are described, and include anoikis, pyroptosis, mitoptosis, parthanatos, and necroptosis.

== Origins ==
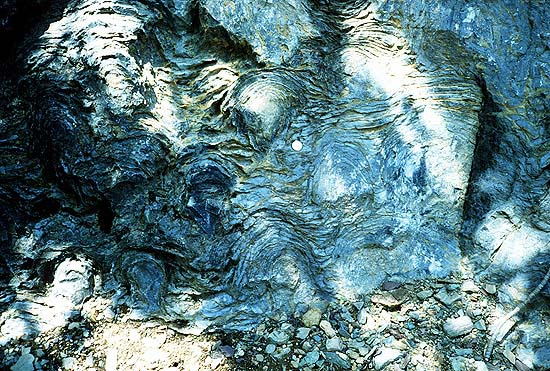
Stromatolites are left behind by cyanobacteria, known as blue-green algae. They are among the oldest fossils of life on Earth. This one-billion-year-old fossil is from Glacier National Park in the United States.

The origin of cells has to do with the origin of life, which began the history of life on Earth. Small molecules needed for life may have been carried to Earth on meteorites, created at deep-sea hydrothermal vents, or synthesized by lightning in a reducing atmosphere. There is little experimental data defining what the first self-replicating forms were. RNA may have been the earliest self-replicating molecule, as it can both store genetic information and catalyze chemical reactions. This process required an enzyme to catalyze the RNA reactions, which may have been the early peptides that formed in hydrothermal vents.

Cells emerged around 4 billion years ago. The first cells were most likely heterotrophs. The early cell membranes were probably simpler and more permeable than later ones, with only a single fatty acid chain per lipid. Lipids spontaneously form bilayered vesicles in water, and could have preceded RNA.

In the theory of symbiogenesis, a merger of an archaean and an aerobic bacterium created the eukaryotes, with aerobic mitochondria, some 2.2 billion years ago. A second merger, 1.6 billion years ago, added chloroplasts, creating the green plants.

Eukaryotic cells were created some 2.2 billion years ago in a process called eukaryogenesis. This is widely agreed to have involved symbiogenesis, in which an archaean and a bacterium came together to create the first eukaryotic common ancestor. It evolved into a population of single-celled organisms that included the last eukaryotic common ancestor, gaining capabilities along the way.

This cell had a new level of complexity, with a nucleus and facultatively aerobic mitochondria. It featured at least one centriole and cilium, sex (meiosis and syngamy), peroxisomes, and a dormant cyst with a cell wall of chitin and/or cellulose. The last eukaryotic common ancestor gave rise to the eukaryotes' crown group, containing the ancestors of animals, fungi, plants, and a diverse range of single-celled organisms. The green plants were created around 1.6 billion years ago with a second episode of symbiogenesis that added chloroplasts, derived from cyanobacteria.

=== Multicellularity ===
Multicellular behavior is demonstrated by microorganisms that are cloned from a single cell and form visible microbial colonies. A microbial consortium of two or more species can form a biofilm by the secretion of extracellular polymeric substances (EPSs). Slime molds consist of different groups of microorganisms grouped together in a multicellular-like fashion.

The first evidence of multicellularity in an organism comes from cyanobacteria-like organisms that lived between 3 and 3.5 billion years ago. Cyanobacteria are variable in morphology, filamentous forms exhibit functional cell differentiation such as heterocysts (for nitrogen fixation), akinetes (resting stage cells), and hormogonia (reproductive, motile filaments). These, together with the intercellular connections they possess, are considered the first signs of multicellularity.

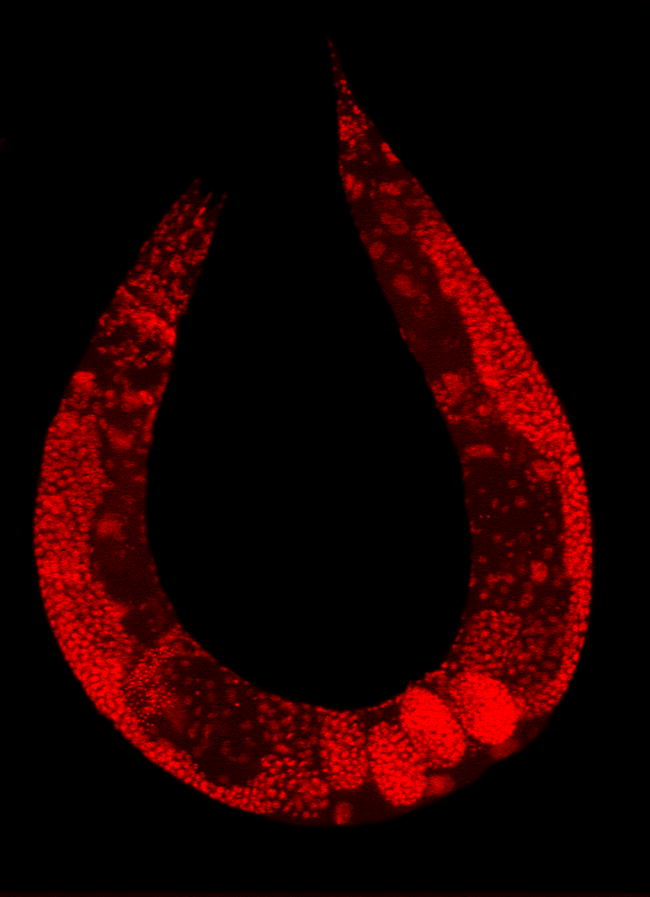
Staining of a nematode Caenorhabditis elegans highlights the nuclei of its cells.

Multicellularity was made possible by the development of the extracellular matrix (ECM) similar in function to the bacterial EPS that consists of extracellular polymeric substances. EPS enables microbial cell adhesion, and is believed to be the first evolutionary step toward multicellular organisms. Basement membranes are a type of specialized extracellular matrix that surrounds most animal tissues, and are essential in their formation. Extracellular matrix components of laminin domains, integrated with other proteins such as cadherins have been described in single-celled motile choanoflagellates that pre-dates the evolutionary emergence of basement membranes, one of the two types of ECM. The emergence of the basement membrane coincided with the origin of multicellularity. The other type of ECM is the interstial matrix.

The evolution of multicellularity from unicellular ancestors has been replicated in the laboratory, in evolution experiments using predation as the selective pressure.

== History of research ==
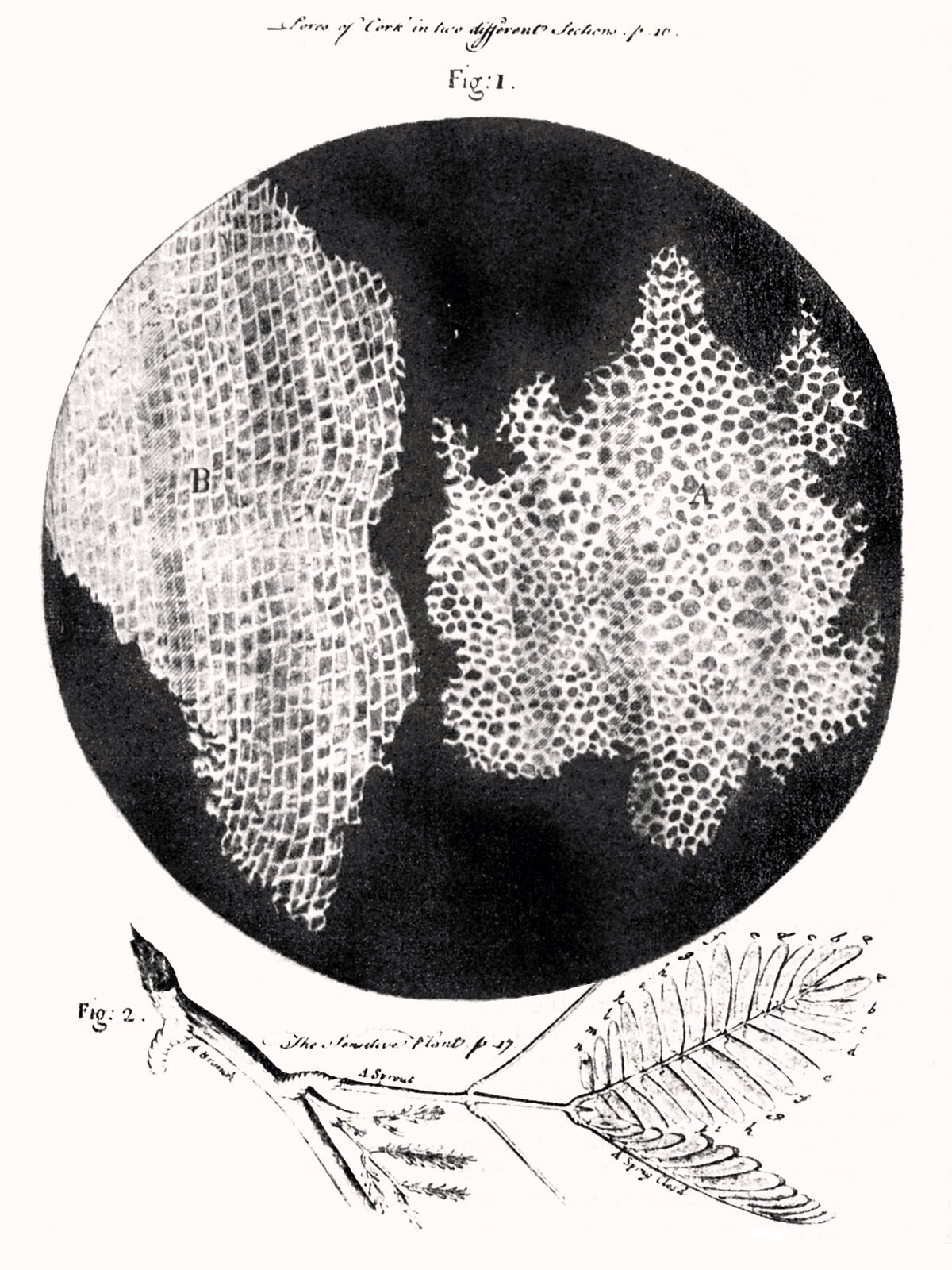
Robert Hooke's drawing of cells in cork, 1665

In 1665, Robert Hooke examined a thin slice of cork under his microscope, and saw a structure of small enclosures. He wrote "I could exceeding plainly perceive it to be all perforated and porous, much like a honeycomb, but that the pores of it were not regular". To further support his theory, Matthias Schleiden and Theodor Schwann studied cells of both animal and plants. What they discovered were significant differences between the two types of cells. This put forth the idea that cells were fundamental to both plants and animals.

- 1632–1723: Antonie van Leeuwenhoek taught himself to make lenses, constructed basic optical microscopes and drew protozoa, such as Vorticella from rain water, and bacteria from his own mouth.
- 1665: Robert Hooke discovered cells in cork, then in living plant tissue using an early microscope. In his book Micrographia he coined the term cell (from Latin cellula, meaning "small room") since they resembled the cells of a monastery.
- 1839: Theodor Schwann and Matthias Jakob Schleiden elucidated the principle that plants and animals are made of cells, concluding that cells are a common unit of structure and development, founding the cell theory.
- 1855: Rudolf Virchow stated that new cells come from pre-existing cells by cell division (omnis cellula ex cellula).
- 1931: Ernst Ruska built the first transmission electron microscope at the University of Berlin. By 1935, he had built an electron microscope with twice the resolution of a light microscope, revealing previously unresolvable organelles.
- 1981: Lynn Margulis published Symbiosis in Cell Evolution detailing how eukaryotic cells were created by symbiogenesis.

== See also ==
- List of human cell types
- The Inner Life of the Cell
- Parakaryon myojinensis
- Syncytium
