= Centisome =

Unit of chromosome length

A centisome is a unit of length defined as one percent of the length of a particular chromosome. This course unit of physical DNA length began to be used in the early exploration of genomes through molecular biology before the resolution of the nucleic acid sequences of chromosomes was possible.

One of the main uses for this unit was for describing the locus of a gene by giving a distance in centisomes from a reference point on the chromosome. For instance, when the complete genome of the bacterium Escherichia coli was finally completed in 1997, it was presented with a scale given in centisomes (as well as one in kilobases). Since bacterial chromosomes are circular, the reference point cannot be an end of the DNA molecule, but must be some point that has some easily determinable unique characteristic. Often this point is the origin of replication, although for E. coli it is the origin of transfer during conjugation. Hence, the reference point for centisome positions is simply a convention established for each individual species of organism.

For the most part, modern scientific literature uses "centisome" as part of a shorthand way of referring to a particular region of interest on the chromosome of particular organisms. For instance, much research has been done on the "Centisome 63" area of the chromosomes of Salmonella species.
