= Circular chromosome =

Type of chromosome

A circular chromosome, showing DNA replication proceeding bidirectionally, with two replication forks generated at the "origin". Each half of the chromosome replicated by one replication fork is called a "replichore". (Graphic computer art by Daniel Yuen)

A circular chromosome is a chromosome in bacteria, archaea, mitochondria, and chloroplasts, in the form of a molecule of circular DNA, unlike the linear chromosome of most eukaryotes.

Most prokaryote chromosomes contain a circular DNA molecule. This has the major advantage of having no free ends (telomeres) to the DNA. By contrast, most eukaryotes have linear DNA requiring elaborate mechanisms to maintain the stability of the telomeres and replicate the DNA. However, a circular chromosome has the disadvantage that after replication, the two progeny circular chromosomes can remain interlinked or tangled, and they must be extricated so that each cell inherits one complete copy of the chromosome during cell division.

== Replication ==
Bidirectional replication in a circular chromosome.

The circular bacteria chromosome replication is best understood in the well-studied bacteria Escherichia coli and Bacillus subtilis. Chromosome replication proceeds in three major stages: initiation, elongation and termination. The initiation stage starts with the ordered assembly of "initiator" proteins at the origin region of the chromosome, called oriC. These assembly stages are regulated to ensure that chromosome replication occurs only once in each cell cycle. During the elongation phase of replication, the enzymes that were assembled at oriC during initiation proceed along each arm (replichore) of the chromosome, in opposite directions away from the oriC, replicating the DNA to create two identical copies. This process is known as bidirectional replication. The entire assembly of molecules involved in DNA replication on each arm is called a replisome. At the forefront of the replisome is a DNA helicase that unwinds the two strands of DNA, creating a moving replication fork. The two unwound single strands of DNA serve as templates for DNA polymerase, which moves with the helicase (together with other proteins) to synthesise a complementary copy of each strand. In this way, two identical copies of the original DNA are created. Eventually, the two replication forks moving around the circular chromosome meet in a specific zone of the chromosome, approximately opposite oriC, called the terminus region. The elongation enzymes then disassemble, and the two "daughter" chromosomes are resolved before cell division is completed.

=== Initiation ===
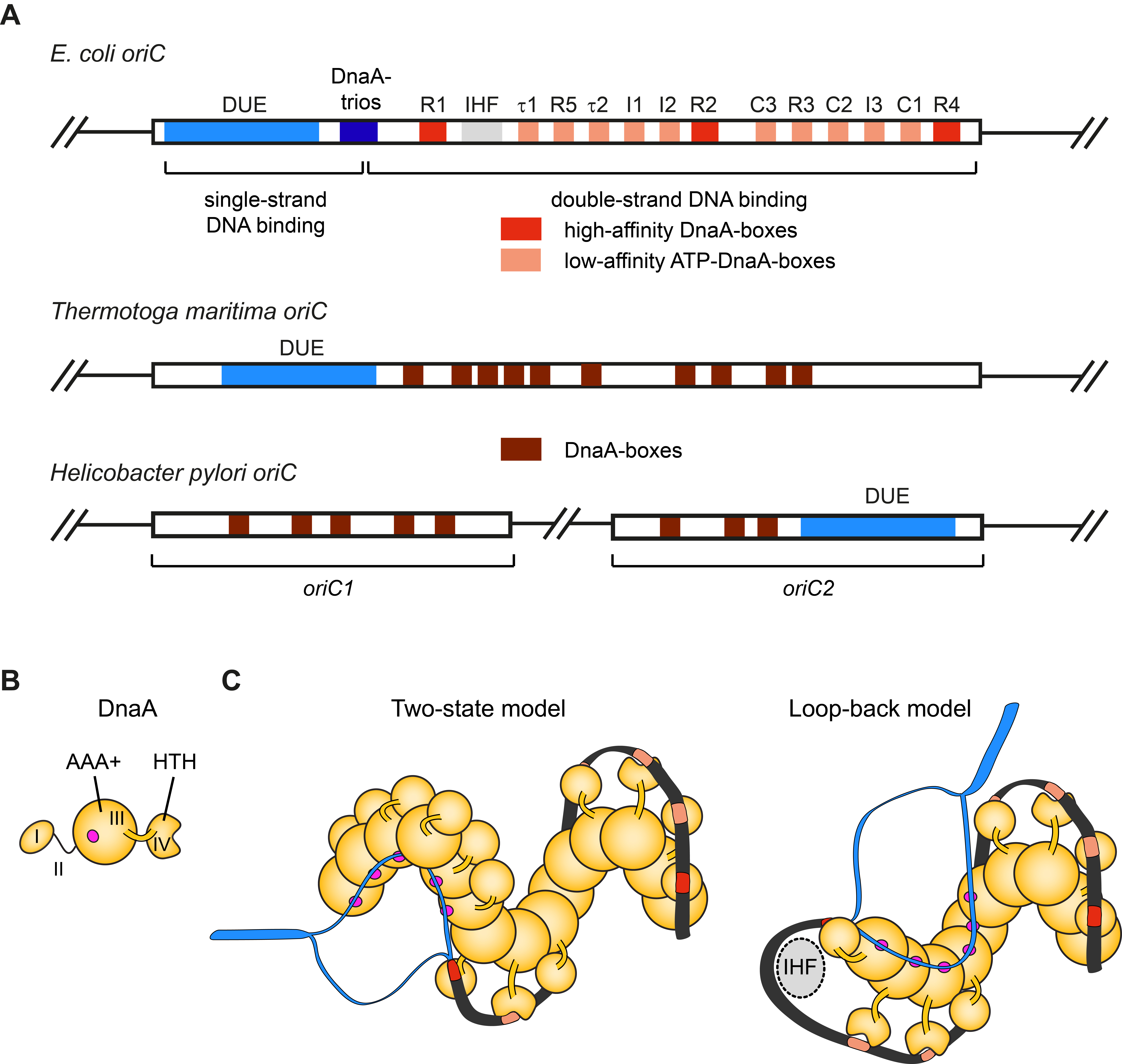
oriC motifs in bacteria

The E. coli origin of replication, called oriC consists of DNA sequences that are recognised by the DnaA protein, which is highly conserved amongst different bacterial species. DnaA binding to the origin initiates the regulated recruitment of other enzymes and proteins that will eventually lead to the establishment of two complete replisomes for bidirectional replication.

DNA sequence elements within oriC that are important for its function include DnaA boxes, a 9-mer repeat with a highly conserved consensus sequence 5' – TTATCCACA – 3', that are recognized by the DnaA protein. DnaA protein plays a crucial role in the initiation of chromosomal DNA replication. Bound to ATP, and with the assistance of bacterial histone-like proteins [HU] DnaA then unwinds an AT-rich region near the left boundary of oriC, which carries three 13-mer motifs, and opens up the double-stranded DNA for entrance of other replication proteins.

This region also contains four "GATC" DNA unwinding element sequences that are recognized by DNA adenine methylase (Dam), an enzyme that modifies the adenine base when this sequence is unmethylated or hemimethylated. The methylation of adenines is important as it alters the conformation of DNA to promote strand separation, and it appears that this region of oriC has a natural tendency to unwind.

DnaA then recruits the replicative helicase, DnaB, from the DnaB-DnaC complex to the unwound region to form the pre-priming complex. After DnaB translocates to the apex of each replication fork, the helicase both unwinds the parental DNA and interacts momentarily with primase.

In order for DNA replication to continue, single stranded binding proteins are needed to prevent the single strands of DNA from forming secondary structures and to prevent them from re-annealing. In addition, DNA gyrase is needed to relieve the topological stress created by the action of DnaB helicase.

=== Elongation ===
When the replication fork moves around the circle, a structure shaped like the Greek letter theta Ө is formed. John Cairns demonstrated the theta structure of E. coli chromosomal replication in 1963, using an innovative method to visualize DNA replication. In his experiment, he radioactively labeled the chromosome by growing his cultures in a medium containing 3H-thymidine. The nucleoside base was incorporated uniformly into the bacterial chromosome. He then isolated the chromosomes by lysing the cells gently and placed them on an electron micrograph (EM) grid which he exposed to X-ray film for two months. This Experiment clearly demonstrates the theta replication model of circular bacterial chromosomes.

As described above, bacterial chromosomal replication occurs in a bidirectional manner. This was first demonstrated by specifically labelling replicating bacterial chromosomes with radioactive isotopes. The regions of DNA undergoing replication during the experiment were then visualized by using autoradiography and examining the developed film microscopically. This allowed the researchers to see where replication was taking place. The first conclusive observations of bidirectional replication was from studies of B. subtilis. Shortly after, the E. coli chromosome was also shown to replicate bidirectionally.

The E. coli DNA polymerase III holoenzyme is a 900 kD complex, possessing an essentially a dimeric structure. Each monomeric unit has a catalytic core, a dimerization subunit, and a processivity component . DNA Pol III uses one set of its core subunits to synthesize the leading strand continuously, while the other set of core subunits cycles from one Okazaki fragment to the next on the looped lagging strand. Leading strand synthesis begins with the synthesis of a short RNA primer at the replication origin by the enzyme Primase (DnaG protein).

Deoxynucleotides are then added to this primer by a single DNA polymerase III dimer, in an integrated complex with DnaB helicase. Leading strand synthesis then proceeds continuously, while the DNA is concurrently unwound at the replication fork. In contrast, lagging strand synthesis is accomplished in short Okazaki fragments. First, an RNA primer is synthesized by primase, and, like that in leading strand synthesis, DNA Pol III binds to the RNA primer and adds deoxyribonucleotides.

When the synthesis of an Okazaki fragment has been completed, replication halts and the core subunits of DNA Pol III dissociates from the β sliding clamp [B sliding clap is the processivity subunit of DNA Pol III]. The RNA primer is removed and replaced with DNA by DNA polymerase I [which also possesses proofreading exonuclease activity] and the remaining nick is sealed by DNA ligase, which then ligates these fragments to form the lagging strand.

A substantial proportion (10-15%) of the replication forks originating at oriC encounter a DNA damage or strand break when cells are grown under normal laboratory conditions (without an exogenous DNA damaging treatment). The encountered DNA damages are ordinarily processed by recombinational repair enzymes to allow continued replication fork progression.

=== Termination ===
Most circular bacterial chromosomes are replicated bidirectionally, starting at one point of origin and replicating in two directions away from the origin. This results in semiconservative replication, in which each new identical DNA molecule contains one template strand from the original molecule, shown as the solid lines, and one new strand, shown as the dotted lines.

Termination is the process of fusion of replication forks and disassembly of the replisomes to yield two separate and complete DNA molecules. It occurs in the terminus region, approximately opposite oriC on the chromosome (Fig 5). The terminus region contains several DNA replication terminator sites, or "Ter" sites. A special "replication terminator" protein must be bound at the Ter site for it to pause replication. Each Ter site has polarity of action, that is, it will arrest a replication fork approaching the Ter site from one direction, but will allow unimpeded fork movement through the Ter site from the other direction. The arrangement of the Ter sites forms two opposed groups that forces the two forks to meet each other within the region they span. This arrangement is called the "replication fork trap."

The Ter sites specifically interact with the replication terminator protein called Tus in E. coli. The Tus-Ter complex impedes the DNA unwinding activity of DnaB in an orientation-dependent manner.

Replication of the DNA separating the opposing replication forks leaves the completed chromosomes joined as 'catenanes' or topologically interlinked circles. The circles are not covalently but mechanically linked, because they are interwound and each is covalently closed. The catenated circles require the action of topoisomerases to separate the circles (decatenation). In E. coli, DNA topoisomerase IV plays the major role in the separation of the catenated chromosomes, transiently breaking both DNA strands of one chromosome and allowing the other chromosome to pass through the break.

There has been some confusion about the role DNA gyrase plays in decatenation. To define the nomenclature, there are two types of topoisomerases: type I produces transient single-strand breaks in DNA and types II produces transient double-strand breaks. As a result, the type I enzyme removes supercoils from DNA one at a time, whereas the type II enzyme removes supercoils two at a time. The topo I of both prokaryotes and eukaryotes are the type I topoisomerase. The eukaryotic topo II, bacterial gyrase, and bacterial topo IV belong to the type II.

DNA gyrase also has topoisomerase type II activity; thus, with it being a homologue of topoisomerase IV (also having topoisomerase II activity) we expect similarity in the two proteins' functions. DNA gyrase's preliminary role is to introduce negative super coils into DNA, thereby relaxing positive supercoils that form during DNA replication. Topoisomerase IV also relaxes positive supercoils, therefore, DNA Gyrase and topoisomerase IV play an almost identical role in removing the positive supercoils ahead of a translocating DNA polymerase, allowing DNA replication to continue unhindered by topological strain.

DNA gyrase is not the sole enzyme responsible for decatenation. In an experiment by Zechiedrich, Khodursky and Cozzarelli in 1997, it was found that topoisomerase IV is the only important decatenase of DNA replication intermediates in bacteria. When DNA gyrase alone was inhibited, most of the catenanes were unlinked. However, when Topoisomerase IV alone was inhibited, decatenation was almost completely blocked. This suggests that Topoisomerase IV is the primary protein for decatenation of interlinked chromosomes in vivo, with DNA gyrase playing a minor role.

== Multiple circular chromosomes ==
Several groups of bacteria, including Brucella, Paracoccus denitrificans, and Vibrio have multiple circular chromosomes.

- Many Alphaproteobacteria have a unique genetic structure. Organisms such as Brucella melitensis, have two different circular chromosomes with an oriC class origin of replication. In other cases, such as the closely related Ochrobactrum, the smaller chromosome has plasmid-like sequences and is clearly a chromid.
- Paracoccus denitrificans has two circular chromosomes and one large plasmid, carrying genes not essential for survival but key to its biochemical behavior. The second chromosome has also been called a chromid, in that they have similar codon usage to the chromosome, are essential to life like the main chromosome, but has plasmid-type elements such as the origin of replication. Many other sequenced Paracoccus also have chromids.
- Vibrio have two circular chromosomes. The larger one uses a traditional oriC-type origin, but the latter uses a P1 plasmid-type origin, making it a chromid.

== See also ==
- Catenane
- Möbius strip
- Nucleoid
- Plasmid
- Ribbon theory
- Rolling circle replication
- Topoisomerase
- Theta type replication
