= Theta structure =

When viewed from above, the replication of circular DNA looks like the Greek letter θ.

A theta structure is an intermediate structure formed during the replication of a circular DNA molecule. Two replication forks can proceed independently around the DNA ring and when viewed from above the structure resembles the Greek letter "theta" (θ). Originally discovered by John Cairns, it led to the understanding that (in this case) bidirectional DNA replication could take place. Proof of the bidirectional nature came from providing replicating cells with a pulse of tritiated thymidine, quenching rapidly and then autoradiographing. Results showed that the radioactive thymidine was incorporated into both forks of the theta structure, not just one, indicating synthesis at both forks in opposite directions around the loop.
