= Adaptive mutation =

Adaptive mutation, also called directed mutation or directed mutagenesis is a controversial evolutionary theory. It posits that mutations, or genetic changes, are much less random and more purposeful than traditional evolution, implying that organisms can respond to environmental stresses by directing mutations to certain genes or areas of the genome. There has been a wide variety of experiments trying to support (or disprove) the idea of adaptive mutation, at least in microorganisms.

== Definition ==
The most widely accepted theory of evolution states that organisms are modified by natural selection where changes caused by mutations improve their chance of reproductive success. Adaptive mutation states that rather than mutations and evolution being random, they are in response to specific stresses. In other words, the mutations that occur are more beneficial and specific to the given stress, instead of random and not a response to anything in particular. The term stress refers to any change in the environment, such as temperature, nutrients, population size, etc. Tests with microorganisms have found that for adaptive mutation, more of the mutations observed after a given stress were more effective at dealing with the stress than chance alone would suggest is possible. This theory of adaptive mutation was first brought to academic attention in the 1980s by John Cairns.

== Recent studies ==
Adaptive mutation is a controversial claim leading to a series of experiments designed to test the idea. Three major experiments are the SOS response, responses to starvation in Escherichia coli, and testing for revertants of a tryptophan auxotroph in Saccharomyces cerevisiae (yeast).

=== Lactose starvation ===
The E. coli strain FC40 has a high rate of mutation, and so is useful for studies, such as for adaptive mutation. Due to a frameshift mutation, a change in the sequence that causes the DNA to code for something different, FC40 is unable to process lactose. When placed in a lactose-rich medium, it has been found that 20% of the cells mutated from Lac- (could not process lactose) to Lac+, meaning they could now utilize the lactose in their environment. The responses to stress are not in current DNA, but the change is made during DNA replication through recombination and the replication process itself, meaning that the adaptive mutation occurs in the current bacteria and will be inherited by the next generations because the mutation becomes part of the genetic code in the bacteria. This is particularly obvious in a study by Cairns, which demonstrated that even after moving E. coli back to a medium with minimal levels of lactose, Lac+ mutants continued to be produced as a response to the previous environment. This would not be possible if adaptive mutation was not at work because natural selection would not favor this mutation in the new environment. Although there are many genes involved in adaptive mutation, RecG, a protein, was found to have an effect on adaptive mutation. By itself, RecG was found to not necessarily lead to a mutational phenotype. However, it was found to inhibit the appearance of revertants (cells that appeared normally, as opposed to those with the mutations being studied) in wild type cells. On the other hand, RecG mutants were key to the expression of RecA-dependent mutations, which were a major portion of study in the SOS response experiments, such as the ability to utilize lactose.

Adaptive mutation was re-proposed in 1988 by John Cairns who was studying Escherichia coli that lacked the ability to metabolize lactose. He grew these bacteria in media in which lactose was the only source of energy. In doing so, he found that the rate at which the bacteria evolved the ability to metabolize lactose was many orders of magnitude higher than would be expected if the mutations were truly random. This inspired him to propose that the mutations that had occurred had been directed at those genes involved in lactose utilization.

Later support for this hypothesis came from Susan Rosenberg, then at the University of Alberta, who found that an enzyme involved in DNA recombinational repair, recBCD, was necessary for the directed mutagenesis observed by Cairns and colleagues in 1989. The directed mutagenesis hypothesis was challenged in 2002, by work showing that the phenomenon was due to general hypermutability due to selected gene amplification, followed by natural selection, and was thus a standard Darwinian process. Later research from 2007 however, concluded that amplification could not account for the adaptive mutation and that "mutants that appear during the first few days of lactose selection are true revertants that arise in a single step".

=== SOS response ===
This experiment is different from the others in one small way: this experiment is concerned with the pathways leading to an adaptive mutation while the others tested the changing environment microorganisms were exposed to. The SOS response in E. coli is a response to DNA damage that must be repaired. The normal cell cycle is put on hold and mutagenesis may begin. This means that mutations will occur to try to fix the damage. This hypermutation, or increased rate of change, response has to have some regulatory process, and some key molecules in this process are RecA, and LexA. These are proteins and act as stoplights for this and other processes. They also appear to be the main contributors to adaptive mutation in E. coli. Changes in presence of one or the other was shown to affect the SOS response, which in turn affected how the cells were able to process lactose, which should not be confused with the lactose starvation experiment. The key point to understand here is that LexA and RecA both were required for adaptive mutation to occur, and without the SOS response adaptive mutation would not be possible.

=== Yeast ===
von Borstel, in the 1970s, conducted experiments similar to the Lactose Starvation experiment with yeast, specifically Saccharomyces cerevisiae. He tested for tryptophan auxotroph revertants. A tryptophan auxotroph cannot make tryptophan for itself, but wild-type cells can and so a revertant will revert to the normal state of being able to produce tryptophan. He found that when yeast colonies were moved from a tryptophan-rich medium to a minimal one, revertants continued to appear for several days. The degree to which revertants were observed in yeast was not as high as with bacteria. Other scientists have conducted similar experiments, such as Hall who tested histidine revertants, or Steele and Jinks-Robertson who tested lysine. These experiments demonstrate how recombination and DNA replication are necessary for adaptive mutation. However, in lysine-tested cells, recombination continued to occur even without selection for it. Steele and Jinks-Robertson concluded that recombination occurred in all circumstances, adaptive or otherwise, while mutations were present only when they were beneficial and adaptive.

Although the production of mutations during selection was not as vigorous as observed with bacteria, these studies are convincing. As mentioned above, a subsequent study adds even more weight to the results with lys2. Steele and Jinks-Robertson found that LYS prototrophs due to interchromosomal recombination events also continue to arise in nondividing cells, but in this case, the production of recombinants continued whether there was selection for them or not. Thus, mutation occurred in stationary phase only when it was adaptive, but recombination occurred whether it was adaptive or not.

Delayed appearance of mutants has also been reported for Candida albicans. With long exposure to sublethal concentrations of heavy metals, colonies of resistant cells began to appear after 5–10 days and continued to appear for 1–2 weeks thereafter. These resistances could have resulted from gene amplification, although the phenotypes were stable during a short period of nonselective growth. However, revertants of two auxotrophies also appeared with similar kinetics. None of these events in Candida albicans have, as yet, been shown to be specific to the selection imposed.
