= Linear chromosome =

A linear chromosome is a chromosome which is linear in shape, and contains terminal ends. In most eukaryotic cells, DNA is arranged in multiple linear chromosomes. In contrast, most prokaryotic cells generally contain a singular circular chromosome.

In general, the factors which led to the evolution of linear chromosomes in eukaryotes are not well understood. One potential selective pressure in favor of linear chromosomes relates to the size of an organism's genome: linear chromosomes may make transcription and replication of large genomes easier. In an organism with a very large genome, circular chromosomes could potentially cause problems relating to torsional strain.

Linear chromosomes are also in some ways disadvantageous or problematic, one of the biggest potential issues being the end replication problem. This is a phenomenon which occurs due to the directionality of DNA replication enzymes, resulting in the gradual loss of genetic material at the ends of linear chromosomes after each subsequent cycle of cell and DNA replication. In order to mitigate the negative effects of this gradual loss of genetic material, eukaryotes have evolved repetitive, non-coding terminal DNA sequences known as telomeres on the ends of chromosomes. These repetitive, non-coding sequences are lost instead of important coding DNA, and they are replenished using enzymes known as telomerases. However, telomeres do not fully prevent the loss of coding DNA at the terminal ends of linear chromosomes. In fact, the eventual loss of coding DNA in cellular lines within an organism is thought to play a role in senescence. Furthermore, evidence suggests that telomeres can be unstable and can be prone to mutations which lead to tumor development. Mutations which lead to the constitutive activity of telomerase can result in the loss of cellular mortality in tumor cell lines, which is associated with the development of cancer.

== In prokaryotes ==
Linear chromosomes are not limited to eukaryotic organisms; some prokaryotic organisms have linear chromosomes as well. Borrelia burgdorferi was the first bacterium to be found to have a linear chromosome, but new examples, such as various Streptomyces and Coxiella burnetii, have been found. Some bacteria, such as Agrobacterium tumefaciens, even have one linear chromosome and one circular chromosome. These bacteria have also independently invented their own versions of telomeres to protect DNA, though they are not foolproof: Streptomyces has telomeres capped by proteins, yet is known to represent "one of the most spectacular examples of genetic instability among prokaryotes".

Experiments in which the circular chromosomes of prokaryotic organisms have been linearized have demonstrated that some prokaryotes can maintain viability even with linear chromosomes.

== In organelles ==
The genomes of most eukaryotic mitochondria and plastids are in a single circular chromosome, in line with their bacterial ancestor. However, a good number of eukaryotic species do harbor linear Mitochondrial DNA (mtDNA), some even broken into multiple molecules, across a wide variety of taxa: animals (mammals, medusozoans, sponges), fungi (especially yeast), plants, and Alveolates. In yeast and plants, the shape of mtDNA depends on life-cycle: during some points they may be circular, but during others a linear branched shape is found, consisting of concatenated copies of the original genome. In these genomes, gene conversion help expand the repeats of their telomeres.

Similar variations can be found in plastid genomes. Maize seedlings have Chloroplast DNA (cpDNA) mostly in a branched linear form. Acetabularia have a true linear cpDNA.
