= Macrodomain =

The Escherichia coli chromosome shows two main levels of global organization: macrodomains and replichores. Macrodomains were discovered by cytological studies. They contain loci showing the same intracellular positioning and choreography during the cell cycle.
