= Flame cell =

Perform excretion and maintain osmotic pressure in Platyhelminthes

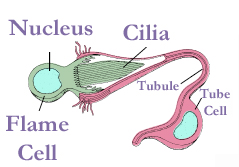

A flame cell is a specialized excretory cell found in simple invertebrates, including flatworms (Platyhelminthes), rotifers and nemerteans; these are the simplest animals to have a dedicated excretory system. Flame cells function like a kidney, removing waste materials. Bundles of flame cells are called protonephridia.

The flame cell has a nucleated cell body, with a "cup-shaped" projection, with flagella covering the inner surface of the cup. The beating of these flagella resemble a flame, giving the cell its name. The cup is attached to a tube cell, whose inner surface is also coated in cilia, which help to move liquid through the tube cell. The tube opens externally through a nephropore, or, in the trematoda, into an excretory bladder. The function of these cells is to regulate the osmotic pressure of the worm, and maintain its ionic balance. Microvilli in the tube cell may be used to reabsorb some ions.

Molecules enter the tubule in tube cells through the gap between the flame cell and tube cell for excretion.

== See also ==
- Nephron, the similar structure in vertebrates
- Nephridia, the excretory organ in annelids
- Malphigian tubule system, the excretory organ in arthropods
- Solenocyte
