= Lynn Zechiedrich =

American biochemist

Elizabeth Lynn Zechiedrich
- Education: University of Arkansas; Vanderbilt University School of Medicine
- Scientific career
- Workplaces: Baylor College of Medicine
- Thesis: Catalytic mechanism of eukaryotic topoisomerase II (1990)

Elizabeth Lynn Zechiedrich is a professor in the department of Molecular Virology and Microbiology at Baylor College of Medicine. Her laboratory's research considers the structure-function properties of DNA and DNA topoisomerases. She was elected to the National Academy of Inventors in 2017.

Zechiedrich is the technical Founder of Twister Biotech, a Baylor College of Medicine spinout company.

== Early life and education ==
Zechiedrich was born in Houston, Texas, and grew up in Arkansas. Zechiedrich studied zoology, music, and mathematics at the University of Arkansas. She moved to Vanderbilt University School of Medicine for graduate studies, where she started to study toposiomerases.

== Research and career ==
In 1997, Zechiedrich was appointed to the faculty at the Baylor College of Medicine. Her research considers the structure-function properties of DNA and DNA topoisomerases. DNA topisomerases are enzymes that modulate DNA structure and function (for example replication, recombination and chromosome segregation), and they are often targets of anti-cancer drugs. Zechiedrich has developed novel mathematical and experimental approaches to characterize the topography of DNA.

Zechiedrich's laboratory has focused on better understanding fluoroquinolones, broad-spectrum antibiotics that target type-2 topoisomerases. These quinolone antibiotics stabilize topoisomerase-DNA cleavage intermediates. She is interested in how Escherichia coli interact with fluoroquinolones. The breaking and resealing of topoisomerases modulates the formation of DNA supercoils and knots, which are overproduced by certain anticancer and antibiotic drugs and can cause cell death. She showed that this coiling and knotting transmits stress along the DNA backbone, which promotes the separation of helical strains and exposes DNA bases. Zechiedrich's collaborators made use of electron cryotomography to better understand the three-dimensional structures of DNA.

Zechiedrich’s laboratory conceived small circular DNA nanoparticles ("minimized vectors") that can be used to study supercoiling and the function of therapeutic topoisomerase inhibitors. The dynamic movement of the DNA 'minivectors' was investigated using atomic force microscopy by Alice Pyne at the University of Sheffield. Minimized vectors can be used as substrates for enzymes that act on DNA, as well as serving as gene therapy vectors. Zechiedrich has theorized that minimized vectors could assist in cancer, cardiovascular disease and respiratory disease therapies.

== Selected publications ==
- D. E. Adams; E. M. Shekhtman; E. L. Zechiedrich; M. B. Schmid; N. R. Cozzarelli (October 1, 1992). "The role of topoisomerase IV in partitioning bacterial replicons and the structure of catenated intermediates in DNA replication". Cell. 71 (2): 277–288. doi:10.1016/0092-8674(92)90356-h. ISSN 0092-8674. PMID 1330320. Wikidata Q46625387.
- A B Khodursky; E L Zechiedrich; N R Cozzarelli (December 1, 1995). "Topoisomerase IV is a target of quinolones in Escherichia coli". Proceedings of the National Academy of Sciences of the United States of America. 92 (25): 11801–11805. Bibcode:1995PNAS...9211801K. doi:10.1073/pnas.92.25.11801. ISSN 0027-8424. PMC 40490. PMID 8524852. Wikidata Q33724600.
- E L Zechiedrich; A B Khodursky; S Bachellier; R Schneider; D Chen; D M Lilley; N R Cozzarelli (March 1, 2000). "Roles of topoisomerases in maintaining steady-state DNA supercoiling in Escherichia coli". Journal of Biological Chemistry. 275 (11): 8103–8113. doi:10.1074/jbc.275.11.8103. ISSN 0021-9258. PMID 10713132. Wikidata Q73538480.
