= Chitin-glucan complex =

Chitin-glucan complex (CGC) is a copolymer (polysaccharide) that makes up fungal cell walls, consisting of covalently-bonded chitin and branched 1,3/1,6-ß-D-glucan. CGCs are alkaline-insoluble. Different species of fungi have different structural compositions of chitin and β-glucan making up the CGCs in their cell walls. Soil composition and other environmental factors can also affect the ratio of chitin to β-glucan found in the CGC. Fungal cell walls may also contain chitosan-glucan complexes, which are similar copolymers but have chitosan instead of chitin. Chitin and chitosan are closely related molecules: greater than 40% of the polymer chain of chitin is made of acetylated glucosamine units, whereas greater than 60% of chitosan is made of deacetylated glucosamine units.

In their natural form, CGCs provide structural support to the fungal cell wall. Biomedical applications of CGCs have been studied, including the immunostimulant properties of A. fumigatus, as well as successful antibacterial activity against S. typhimurium by CGCs from A. niger and M. rouxii. There is some evidence that CGCs can act as an effective prebiotic, as it was tested on growing 100 different bifidobacterial strains as well as on rats in vivo. CGCs have many industrial applications, such as in food, cosmetics, and textiles industries, because they can be prepared easily without toxins. As food additives, they are commonly used due to their ability to adsorb heavy metal ions. Additionally, CGCs are produced in high volume industrially because they can be broken down into their constitutive components by hydrolysis, producing pure chitin (or chitosan) and β-glucans.

Rather than being produced from animal parts, pure chitin can be extracted from the cell walls of the fungus Pichia pastoris, recently classified as Komagataella pastoris. Unlike chitin extracted from crustaceans, for example, this chitin contains no heavy metals. A study revealed that the complex exhibits traces of α-chitin in the molecular structure via x-ray diffraction. The similarities in structure and physical properties suggest that the complex is a suitable alternative to crustacean-based chitin as fungi are a more feasible and reliable source of raw materials.

== Biomedical applications ==
Chitin-glucan complex (CGC) has gained attention for its potential in various medical applications due to its biocompatible and biodegradable nature. Innovations in processing CGC with cholinium-based ionic liquids (ILs) have enabled the creation of versatile materials such as films and gels, tailored for biomedical use. Films produced from CGC are dense, flexible, and highly absorbent, capable of holding more than twice their weight in water. These features make them particularly useful as wound dressings, where they help retain moisture and act as a barrier against contaminants. Additionally, their structural flexibility and compatibility with biological tissues make them suitable as scaffolds in tissue engineering, supporting cell growth and regeneration.

In contrast, CGC-derived gels offer elastic and adaptable properties influenced by their water content, which can be adjusted to meet specific needs. These characteristics make them promising for drug delivery applications, where controlled release of medications is essential. Moreover, the gels' supportive structure provides an excellent environment for cell cultures, enabling the growth and differentiation of various cell types. These advancements underscore the versatility of CGC-based materials in addressing key challenges in medicine, particularly in wound care, tissue regeneration, and drug delivery.
