= John Cairns (biochemist) =

British molecular biologist and physician (1922–2018)

John Cairns FRS
- Born: Hugh John Forster Cairns; 21 November 1922
- Died: 12 November 2018 (aged 95)
- Education: University of Oxford B.A., 1943, B.M., 1946, M.D., 1946
- Known for: Molecular genetics, cancer research, public health
- Scientific career
- Fields: Virology; Molecular Biology; Genetics; Cancer Biology
- Workplaces: Walter and Eliza Hall Institute of Medical Research, Melbourne, Australia; Virus Research Institute, Entebbe, Uganda; Cold Spring Harbor Laboratory; Mill Hill Laboratory, Imperial Cancer Research Fund; Harvard University

Hugh John Forster Cairns FRS (21 November 1922 – 12 November 2018) was a British physician and molecular biologist who made significant contributions to molecular genetics, cancer research, and public health.

== Career ==
Cairns received his M.D. from Oxford. He then worked as a virologist at the Walter and Eliza Hall Institute of Medical Research in Melbourne, Australia and at the Virus Research Institute at Entebbe, Uganda. He returned to Australia to work in the School of Microbiology at the John Curtin School of Medical Research. Cairns took a sabbatical to research at the Cold Spring Harbor Laboratory between 1960 and 1961, and returned there to serve as the director from 1963 to 1968. He remained a staff member at Cold Spring Harbor until 1972, when he was appointed head of the Mill Hill Laboratory of the Imperial Cancer Research Fund. After leaving Mill Hill in 1980, he took up a professorship at the Harvard School of Public Health. He retired in 1991.

In his 1963 paper "The bacterial chromosome and its manner of replication as seen by autoradiography", Cairns demonstrated by autoradiography that the DNA of the bacterium Escherichia coli was a single molecule that is replicated at a moving locus (the replicating fork) at which both new DNA strands are being synthesized. Subsequently, it was found that there were in fact two moving forks, traveling simultaneously in opposite directions around the chromosome.

In 1974 he was elected Fellow of the Royal Society. In 1981, John Cairns received a MacArthur Foundation ("genius") Fellowship. He is the author of the 1978 book Cancer: Science and Society (now out of print) and the 1997 book, Matters of Life and Death: Perspectives on Public Health, Molecular Biology, Cancer, and the Prospects for the Human Race. Together with James Watson and Gunther Stent, Cairns also edited the collection of historical accounts Phage and the Origins of Molecular Biology (1st edition, 1966; 2nd edition, 1992; 3rd edition, 2007).

== See also ==
- Theta structure
- Adaptive mutation
