= Solenocyte =

Type of elongated, flagellated cells

In biology, solenocytes are elongated, flagellated cells commonly found in lower invertebrates, such as flatworms (phylum Platyhelminthes), chordates (sub-phylum Cephalochordata) and several other animal species. In terms of function, solenocytes play a significant role in the excretory systems of their host organism(s). For example, the lancelets, also referred to as amphioxus (genus Branchiostoma), utilize solenocytic protonephridia to perform excretion. In addition to excretion, these cells contribute to ion regulation and osmoregulation. With this in mind, solenocytes form subtypes of protonephridium and are often compared to another specialized excretory cell type, i.e., flame cells. Solenocytes have flagella, while flame cells are generally ciliated.

== Cellular structure and configuration ==
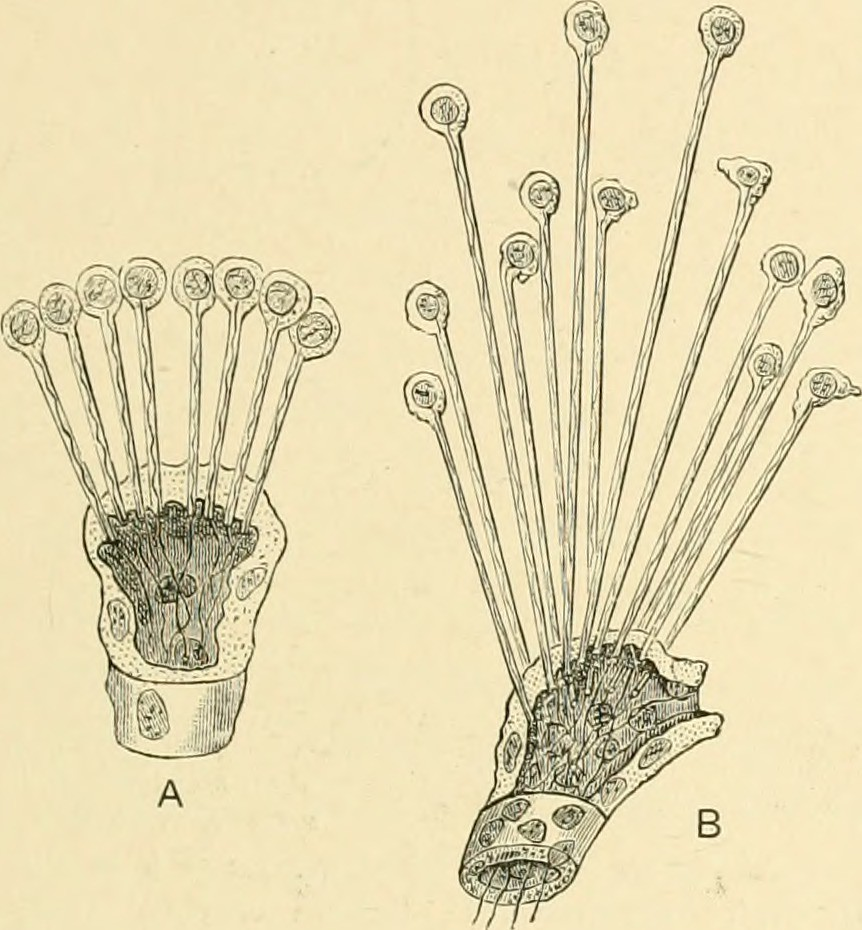
Figure 1. This image illustrates the basic cellular structure of a solenocyte cluster extending off of a side branch of protonephridium (A and B). The solenocyte cell body is circular in nature and resides at the top of each tubule, while the flagella pass through the length of the intracellular tubule lumen.

Solenocytes are mesoderm-derived and morphologically diverse cells containing a cytoplasmic cap or enclosed cell body with a nucleus residing in its core. A long tubule is attached to the cell body, and within its intracellular lumen lies either one or two long flagella. The continuously moving vibratile flagella extend from a protein structure, referred to as the basal body, found at the base of the flagellar structure. Extending through the length of the tubule, the flagella are able to protrude into the protonephridium lumen rather designedly (see Figure 1).

The tubule wall structure is composed of thin, pillar-like rods perforated by tiny openings. These pore spaces are likely the site of interstitial fluid filtration.

A nephridium contains approximately 500 solenocytes, each of which is roughly 50 microns in length (this measure includes the nucleated cell body and tubule). The excretory organ of Amphioxus (genus Branchiostoma) belcheri contains clusters of solenocytes (the majority of which are situated along the ligamentum denticulatum coelomic surface). These clusters are composed at patterned intervals, generating groups amongst the renal tubules of B. belcheri, which in a way, resemble mesothelial cells surrounding the human body's internal organs. Additional studies indicate a resemblance to vertebrate podocytes, as vascular fluid within the ligamentum denticulatum may travel into the coelom through the narrow network of solenocyte gaps or foot processes.

== Function and mechanistic aspects ==
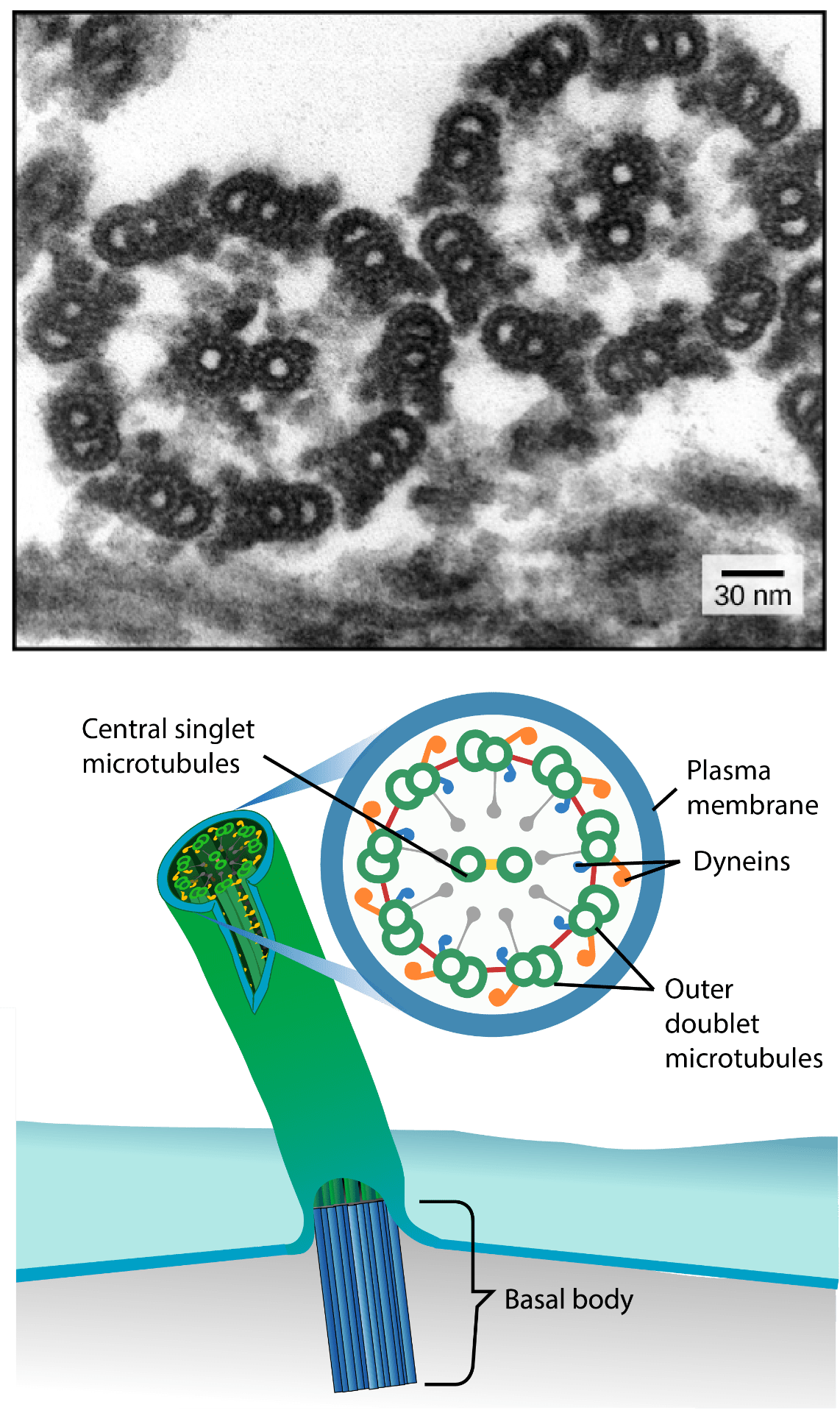
Figure 2. The transmission electron micrograph (TEM) depicts the 9+2 array of microtubules of two eukaryotic flagella in cross-sections (upper panel).

In regards to function, flagella play a significant role in the excretory nature of solenocytes. These motile appendages extend from the solenocyte membrane and utilize the support of an axial filament (or axoneme), basal body, as well as numerous microtubules. That said, the stability of the flagellum is crucial to its motility. The basal body, composed of nine triplet microtubules, functions to anchor the flagella in place (acting as a modified centriole). Situated at the center of each flagellum is the highly conserved axoneme, which contains nine doublet microtubules encircling a pair of singlet microtubules (generating a 9+2 pattern). Thousands of walking dynein motors are attached to the axoneme doublets, resulting in the hydrolysis of adenosine triphosphate (ATP), which fuels flagellar motility. More specifically, the dyneins anchor onto one doublet within the outer microtubule ring, and as they "walk" towards an adjacent doublet, the entire flagellar structure is able to bend and beat (see Figure 2). In sum, flagellar motility enables solenocytes to waft excretory materials and coelomic fluid down the intracellular tubule lumen.

In several lower invertebrates, solenocyte clusters project directly into coelomic canals, where they are submerged in coelomic fluid. This fluid contains a variety of materials, including salts, proteins, and corpuscles (e.g., leucocytes, phagocytes, eleocytes, mucocytes, etc.). In that respect, solenocytes play a major role in osmoregulation, ion regulation, and homeostasis through the movement of coelomic fluid.

Branchiostoma nephridia also have tiny blood vessels, and the protonephridia function to absorb nitrogenous waste from coelomic fluid, as well as the blood sinuses via diffusion.

== Implications of research ==
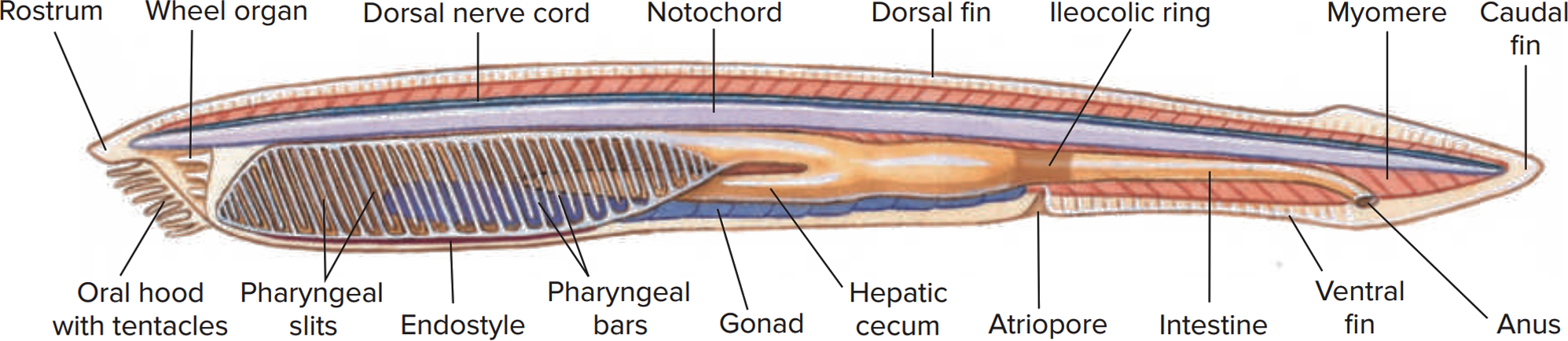
Figure 3. This diagram outlines the fundamental anatomy of the lancelet, also called amphioxus (Branchiostoma).

In addition to a greater understanding of excretory organs within other invertebrates, further research on solenocyte composition and function can advance current knowledge on renal function, human health, and even certain genetic diseases within the vertebrate world. The cephalochordate amphioxus (see Figure 3) can contribute to this research as a close relative to vertebrates.

=== Hatschek's nephridium ===
Compared to paired series of protonephridia, Hatschek's nephridium is a large unpaired excretory structure found within Branchiostoma virginiae. The nephridium, along with its collection tubule, is located to the left of the notochord and beside the left anterior aorta. Hatschek's nephridium is like a protonephridium with a single, bent branch consisting of numerous solenocytes. The anterior end of this structure sits directly in front of Hatschek's pit, while the posterior end (at the rear of the velum) opens into the endodermal pharynx. Flagellated filtration cells called cyrtopodocytes occupy the length of the collection tubule. These filtration cells closely resemble solenocyte structure and function.

=== Renal function ===
Research suggests that coelomic myoepithelial cells in amphioxus (Branchiostoma) may have significance in renal function. Located along the coelom, myoepithelial cells have both thick (18–25 nm in diameter) and thin (5–7 nm in diameter) microfilaments. That said, these microfilaments appear to be more abundant in myoepithelial cells that are in close proximity to solenocytes attached to the ligamentum denticulatum coelomic surface. The beating of solenocyte flagella to propel coelomic fluid throughout excretory tubules leads to the idea that myoepithelial cells near solenocyte clusters can impact renal function by regulating fluid motility within the coelomic cavity.

=== Human health and genetic diseases ===
Within the vertebrate lineage, significant genome duplications took place after the divergence of Branchiostoma, thus making it a potentially valuable model for gaining insight into vertebrate biological mechanisms. Branchiostoma has use for investigating human health and genetic disease. Along with signaling pathways, numerous homologs of vertebrate organs share cellular, developmental, and physiological parameters with their vertebrate equivalents. On that premise, solenocyte function within Branchiostoma could provide insight into metabolic diseases, such as renal cell carcinoma (RCC).
