= Replichore =

The Escherichia coli chromosome shows two main levels of global organization, macrodomains and replichores. In E. coli chromosomes, the origin and terminus of replication divide the genome into oppositely replicated halves called replichores. Replichore 1, which is replicated clockwise, has the presented strand of E. coli as its leading strand; in replichore 2 the complementary strand is the leading one. Many features of E. coli are oriented with respect to replication.
